Greece, officially the Hellenic Republic, is a country in Southeast Europe. It is situated on the southern tip of the Balkan Peninsula, and is located at the crossroads of Europe, Asia, and Africa. Greece shares land borders with Albania to the northwest, North Macedonia and Bulgaria to the north, and Turkey to the northeast. The Aegean Sea lies to the east of the mainland, the Ionian Sea to the west, and the Sea of Crete and the Mediterranean Sea to the south. Greece has the longest coastline on the Mediterranean Basin, featuring thousands of islands. The country consists of nine traditional geographic regions, and has a population of approximately 10.4 million. Athens is the nation's capital and largest city, followed by Thessaloniki and Patras.

Greece is considered the cradle of Western civilization, being the birthplace of democracy, Western philosophy, Western literature, historiography, political science, major scientific and mathematical principles, theatre and the Olympic Games. From the eighth century BC, the Greeks were organised into various independent city-states, known as poleis (singular polis), which spanned the Mediterranean and the Black Sea. Philip II of Macedon united most of present-day Greece in the fourth century BC, with his son Alexander the Great rapidly conquering much of the ancient world, from the eastern Mediterranean to the North Western parts of India. The subsequent Hellenistic period saw the height of Greek culture and influence in antiquity. Greece was annexed by Rome in the second century BC, becoming an integral part of the Roman Empire and its continuation, the Byzantine Empire, which was culturally and linguistically predominantly Greek. The Greek Orthodox Church, which emerged in the first century AD, helped shape modern Greek identity and transmitted Greek traditions to the wider Orthodox world. After falling under Ottoman rule in the mid-15th century, Greece emerged as a modern nation state in 1830 following a war of independence. Over the first hundred years the kingdom of Greece sought its territorial expansion, which was mainly achieved in the early 20th century, during the Balkan Wars and up until the catastrophe of Greece's Asia Minor Campaign in 1922. The short-lived republic that followed, beset by the ramifications of civil strife, came to an end in 1936, when the imposition of a royalist dictatorship inaugurated a long period of authoritarian rule, marked by military occupation during World War II, civil war and military dictatorship. Greece achieved record economic growth from 1950 through the 1970s, allowing it to join the ranks of developed nations. Democracy was restored in 1974–75, and Greece has been a parliamentary republic ever since. The country's rich historical legacy is reflected in part by its 18 UNESCO World Heritage Sites.

Greece is a unitary parliamentary republic, and a developed country, with an advanced high-income economy, and a high quality of life, ranking 32nd in the Human Development Index. Its economy is among the largest in the Balkans, where it is an important regional investor. A founding member of the United Nations, Greece was the tenth member to join the European Communities (precursor to the European Union) and has been part of the Eurozone since 2001. It is also a member of numerous other international institutions, including the Council of Europe, NATO, the OECD, the WTO, and the OSCE. Greece has a unique cultural heritage, large tourism industry, and prominent shipping sector.

Name 

This is the source of the English alternative name Hellas, which is mostly found in archaic or poetic contexts today. The Greek adjectival form  is sometimes also translated as Hellenic and is often rendered in this way in the formal names of Greek institutions, as in the official name of the Greek state, the Hellenic Republic.

The term is possibly derived from the Proto-Indo-European root , "to grow old", more specifically from Graea (ancient city), said by Aristotle to be the oldest in Greece, and the source of colonists for the Naples area.

History

Prehistory and early history 

The Apidima Cave in Mani, in southern Greece, contains the oldest remains of anatomically modern humans outside of Africa, dated to 210,000 years ago. All three stages of the Stone Age (Paleolithic, Mesolithic, and Neolithic) are represented in Greece, for example in the Franchthi Cave. Neolithic settlements in Greece, dating from the 7th millennium BC, are the oldest in Europe by several centuries, as Greece lies on the route via which farming spread from the Near East to Europe.

Greece is home to the first advanced civilizations in Europe and is considered the birthplace of Western civilisation, beginning with the Cycladic civilization on the islands of the Aegean Sea at around 3200 BC, the Minoan civilization in Crete (2700–1500 BC), and then the Mycenaean civilization on the mainland (1600–1100 BC). These civilizations possessed writing, the Minoans using an undeciphered script known as Linear A, and the Mycenaeans writing the earliest attested form of Greek in Linear B. The Mycenaeans gradually absorbed the Minoans, but collapsed violently around 1200 BC, along with other civilizations, during the regional event known as the Late Bronze Age collapse. This ushered in a period known as the Greek Dark Ages, from which written records are absent. Though the unearthed Linear B texts are too fragmentary for the reconstruction of the political landscape and can't support the existence of a larger state, contemporary Hittite and Egyptian records suggest the presence of a single state under a "Great King" based in mainland Greece.

Archaic and Classical period

The end of the Dark Ages is traditionally dated to 776 BC, the year of the first Olympic Games. The Iliad and the Odyssey, the foundational texts of Western literature, are believed to have been composed by Homer in the 7th or 8th centuries BC. With the end of the Dark Ages, there emerged various kingdoms and city-states across the Greek peninsula, which spread to the shores of the Black Sea, Southern Italy ("Magna Graecia") and Asia Minor. These states and their colonies reached great levels of prosperity that resulted in an unprecedented cultural boom, that of classical Greece, expressed in architecture, drama, science, mathematics and philosophy. In 508 BC, Cleisthenes instituted the world's first democratic system of government in Athens.

By 500 BC, the Persian Empire controlled the Greek city states in Asia Minor and Macedonia. Attempts by some of the Greek city-states of Asia Minor to overthrow Persian rule failed, and Persia invaded the states of mainland Greece in 492 BC, but was forced to withdraw after a defeat at the Battle of Marathon in 490 BC. In response, the Greek city-states formed the Hellenic League in 481 BC, led by Sparta, which was the first historically recorded union of Greek states since the mythical union of the Trojan War. A second invasion by the Persians followed in 480 BC. Following decisive Greek victories in 480 and 479 BC at Salamis, Plataea, and Mycale, the Persians were forced to withdraw for a second time, marking their eventual withdrawal from all of their European territories. Led by Athens and Sparta, the Greek victories in the Greco-Persian Wars are considered a pivotal moment in world history, as the 50 years of peace that followed are known as the Golden Age of Athens, the seminal period of ancient Greek development that laid many of the foundations of Western civilization.

Lack of political unity within Greece resulted in frequent conflict between Greek states. The most devastating intra-Greek war was the Peloponnesian War (431–404 BC), won by Sparta and marking the demise of the Athenian Empire as the leading power in ancient Greece. Both Athens and Sparta were later overshadowed by Thebes and eventually Macedon, with the latter uniting most of the city-states of the Greek hinterland in the League of Corinth (also known as the Hellenic League or Greek League) under the control of Philip II. Despite this development, the Greek world remained largely fragmented and would not be united under a single power until the Roman years. 

Following the assassination of Phillip II, his son Alexander III ("The Great") assumed the leadership of the League of Corinth and launched an invasion of the Persian Empire with the combined forces of the League in 334 BC. Undefeated in battle, Alexander had conquered the Persian Empire in its entirety by 330 BC. By the time of his death in 323 BC, he had created one of the largest empires in history, stretching from Greece to India. Upon his death, his empire split into several kingdoms, the most famous of which were the Seleucid Empire, Ptolemaic Egypt, the Greco-Bactrian Kingdom, and the Indo-Greek Kingdom. Many Greeks migrated to Alexandria, Antioch, Seleucia, and the many other new Hellenistic cities in Asia and Africa. Although the political unity of Alexander's empire could not be maintained, it resulted in the Hellenistic civilization and spread the Greek language and Greek culture in the territories conquered by Alexander. Greek science, technology, and mathematics are generally considered to have reached their peak during the Hellenistic period.

Hellenistic and Roman periods (323 BC – 4th century AD) 

After a period of confusion following Alexander's death, the Antigonid dynasty, descended from one of Alexander's generals, established its control over Macedon and most of the Greek city-states by 276 BC. From about 200 BC the Roman Republic became increasingly involved in Greek affairs and engaged in a series of wars with Macedon. Macedon's defeat at the Battle of Pydna in 168 BC signalled the end of Antigonid power in Greece. In 146 BC, Macedonia was annexed as a province by Rome, and the rest of Greece became a Roman protectorate.

The process was completed in 27 BC when the Roman emperor Augustus annexed the rest of Greece and constituted it as the senatorial province of Achaea. Despite their military superiority, the Romans admired and became heavily influenced by the achievements of Greek culture, hence Horace's famous statement: Graecia capta ferum victorem cepit ("Greece, although captured, took its wild conqueror captive"). The epics of Homer inspired the Aeneid of Virgil, and authors such as Seneca the younger wrote using Greek styles. Roman heroes such as Scipio Africanus, tended to study philosophy and regarded Greek culture and science as an example to be followed. Similarly, most Roman emperors maintained an admiration for things Greek in nature. The Roman emperor Nero visited Greece in AD 66, and performed at the Ancient Olympic Games, despite the rules against non-Greek participation. Hadrian was also particularly fond of the Greeks. Before becoming emperor, he served as an eponymous archon of Athens.

Greek-speaking communities of the Hellenised East were instrumental in the spread of early Christianity in the 2nd and 3rd centuries, and Christianity's early leaders and writers (notably St. Paul) were mostly Greek-speaking, though generally not from Greece itself. The New Testament was written in Greek, and some of its sections (Corinthians, Thessalonians, Philippians, Revelation of St. John of Patmos) attest to the importance of churches in Greece in early Christianity. Nevertheless, much of Greece clung tenaciously to paganism, and ancient Greek religious practices were still in vogue in the late 4th century AD, when they were outlawed by the Roman emperor Theodosius I in 391–392. The last recorded Olympic games were held in 393, and many temples were destroyed or damaged in the century that followed. In Athens and rural areas, paganism is attested well into the sixth century AD and even later. The closure of the Neoplatonic Academy of Athens by the Emperor Justinian in 529 is considered by many to mark the end of antiquity, although there is evidence that the Academy continued its activities for some time after that. Some remote areas such as the southeastern Peloponnese remained pagan until well into the 10th century AD.

Medieval period (4th–15th century) 

The Roman Empire in the east, following the fall of the Empire in the west in the 5th century, is conventionally known as the Byzantine Empire (but was simply called "Kingdom of the Romans" in its own time) and lasted until 1453. With its capital in Constantinople, its language and culture were Greek and its religion was predominantly Eastern Orthodox Christian.

From the 4th century the Empire's Balkan territories, including Greece, suffered from the dislocation of barbarian invasions. The raids and devastation of the Goths and Huns in the 4th and 5th centuries and the Slavic invasion of Greece in the 7th century resulted in a dramatic collapse in imperial authority in the Greek peninsula. Following the Slavic invasion, the imperial government retained formal control of only the islands and coastal areas, particularly the densely populated walled cities such as Athens, Corinth and Thessalonica, while some mountainous areas in the interior held out on their own and continued to recognise imperial authority. Outside of these areas, a limited amount of Slavic settlement is generally thought to have occurred, although on a much smaller scale than previously thought. However, the view that Greece in late antiquity underwent a crisis of decline, fragmentation and depopulation is now considered outdated, as Greek cities show a high degree of institutional continuity and prosperity between the 4th and 6th centuries AD (and possibly later as well). In the early 6th century, Greece had approximately 80 cities according to the Synecdemus chronicle, and the period from the 4th to the 7th century AD is considered one of high prosperity not just in Greece but in the entire Eastern Mediterranean.

Until the 8th century almost all of modern Greece was under the jurisdiction of the Holy See of Rome according to the system of Pentarchy. Byzantine Emperor Leo III moved the border of the Patriarchate of Constantinople westward and northward in the 8th century.

The Byzantine recovery of lost provinces began toward the end of the 8th century and most of the Greek peninsula came under imperial control again, in stages, during the 9th century. This process was facilitated by a large influx of Greeks from Sicily and Asia Minor to the Greek peninsula, while at the same time many Slavs were captured and re-settled in Asia Minor and the few that remained were assimilated. During the 11th and 12th centuries the return of stability resulted in the Greek peninsula benefiting from strong economic growth – much stronger than that of the Anatolian territories of the Empire. During that time, the Greek Orthodox Church was also instrumental in the spread of Greek ideas to the wider Orthodox world.

Following the Fourth Crusade and the fall of Constantinople to the "Latins" in 1204, mainland Greece was split between the Greek Despotate of Epirus (a Byzantine successor state) and French rule (known as the Frankokratia), while some islands came under Venetian rule. The re-establishment of the Byzantine imperial capital in Constantinople in 1261 was accompanied by the empire's recovery of much of the Greek peninsula, although the Frankish Principality of Achaea in the Peloponnese and the rival Greek Despotate of Epirus in the north both remained important regional powers into the 14th century, while the islands remained largely under Genoese and Venetian control. During the Paleologi dynasty (1261–1453) a new era of Greek patriotism emerged accompanied by a turning back to ancient Greece.

As such prominent personalities at the time also proposed changing the imperial title to "Emperor of the Hellenes", and, in late fourteenth century, the emperor was frequently referred to as the "Emperor of the Hellenes". Similarly, in several international treaties of that time the Byzantine emperor is styled as "Imperator Graecorum".

In the 14th century much of the Greek peninsula was lost by the Byzantine Empire at first to the Serbs and then to the Ottomans. By the beginning of the 15th century, the Ottoman advance meant that Byzantine territory in Greece was limited mainly to its then-largest city, Thessaloniki, and the Peloponnese (Despotate of the Morea). After the fall of Constantinople to the Ottomans in 1453, the Morea was one of the last remnants of the Byzantine Empire to hold out against the Ottomans. However, this, too, fell to the Ottomans in 1460, completing the Ottoman conquest of mainland Greece. With the Turkish conquest, many Byzantine Greek scholars, who up until then were largely responsible for preserving Classical Greek knowledge, fled to the West, taking with them a large body of literature and thereby significantly contributing to the Renaissance.

Venetian possessions and Ottoman rule (15th century – 1821) 

While most of mainland Greece and the Aegean islands was under Ottoman control by the end of the 15th century, Cyprus and Crete remained Venetian territory and did not fall to the Ottomans until 1571 and 1670 respectively. The only part of the Greek-speaking world that escaped long-term Ottoman rule was the Ionian Islands, which remained Venetian until their capture by the First French Republic in 1797, then passed to the United Kingdom in 1809 until their unification with Greece in 1864.

While some Greeks in the Ionian Islands and Constantinople lived in prosperity, and Greeks of Constantinople (Phanariotes) achieved positions of power within the Ottoman administration, much of the population of mainland Greece suffered the economic consequences of the Ottoman conquest. Heavy taxes were enforced, and in later years the Ottoman Empire enacted a policy of creation of hereditary estates, effectively turning the rural Greek populations into serfs.

The Greek Orthodox Church and the Ecumenical Patriarchate of Constantinople were considered by the Ottoman governments as the ruling authorities of the entire Orthodox Christian population of the Ottoman Empire, whether ethnically Greek or not. Although the Ottoman state did not force non-Muslims to convert to Islam, Christians faced several types of discrimination intended to highlight their inferior status in the Ottoman Empire. Discrimination against Christians, particularly when combined with harsh treatment by local Ottoman authorities, led to conversions to Islam, if only superficially. In the 19th century, many "crypto-Christians" returned to their old religious allegiance.

The nature of Ottoman administration of Greece varied, though it was invariably arbitrary and often harsh. Some cities had governors appointed by the Sultan, while others (like Athens) were self-governed municipalities. Mountainous regions in the interior and many islands remained effectively autonomous from the central Ottoman state for many centuries.

Prior to the Greek Revolution of 1821, there had been a number of wars which saw Greeks fight against the Ottomans, such as the Greek participation in the Battle of Lepanto in 1571, the Epirus peasants' revolts of 1600–1601 (led by the Orthodox bishop Dionysios Skylosophos), the Morean War of 1684–1699, and the Russian-instigated Orlov Revolt in 1770, which aimed at breaking up the Ottoman Empire in favour of Russian interests. These uprisings were put down by the Ottomans with great bloodshed. On the other side, many Greeks were conscripted as Ottoman citizens to serve in the Ottoman army (and especially the Ottoman navy), while also the Ecumenical Patriarchate of Constantinople, responsible for the Orthodox, remained in general loyal to the empire.

The 16th and 17th centuries are regarded as something of a "dark age" in Greek history, with the prospect of overthrowing Ottoman rule appearing remote with only the Ionian islands remaining free of Turkish domination. Corfu withstood three major sieges in 1537, 1571 and 1716 all of which resulted in the repulsion of the Ottomans. However, in the 18th century, due to their mastery of shipping and commerce, a wealthy and dispersed Greek merchant class arose. These merchants came to dominate trade within the Ottoman Empire, establishing communities throughout the Mediterranean, the Balkans, and Western Europe. Though the Ottoman conquest had cut Greece off from significant European intellectual movements such as the Reformation and the Enlightenment, these ideas together with the ideals of the French Revolution and romantic nationalism began to penetrate the Greek world via the mercantile diaspora. In the late 18th century, Rigas Feraios, the first revolutionary to envision an independent Greek state, published a series of documents relating to Greek independence, including but not limited to a national anthem and the first detailed map of Greece, in Vienna. Feraios was murdered by Ottoman agents in 1798.

Modern period

Greek War of Independence (1821–1832) 

In the late eighteenth century, an increase in secular learning during the Modern Greek Enlightenment led to the emergence among Westernized Greek-speaking elites of the diaspora of the notion of a Greek nation tracing its existence to ancient Greece, distinct from the other Orthodox peoples, and having a right to political autonomy. One of the organizations formed in this intellectual milieu was the Filiki Eteria, a secret organization formed by merchants in Odessa in 1814. Appropriating a long-standing tradition of Orthodox messianic prophecy aspiring to the resurrection of the eastern Roman empire and creating the impression they had the backing of Tsarist Russia, they managed amidst a crisis of Ottoman trade, from 1815 onwards, to engage traditional strata of the Greek Orthodox world in their liberal nationalist cause. The Filiki Eteria planned to launch revolution in the Peloponnese, the Danubian Principalities and Constantinople. The first of these revolts began on 6 March 1821 in the Danubian Principalities under the leadership of Alexandros Ypsilantis, but it was soon put down by the Ottomans. The events in the north spurred the Greeks of the Peloponnese into action and on 17 March 1821 the Maniots declared war on the Ottomans.

By the end of the month, the Peloponnese was in open revolt against the Ottomans and by October 1821 the Greeks under Theodoros Kolokotronis had captured Tripolitsa. The Peloponnesian revolt was quickly followed by revolts in Crete, Macedonia and Central Greece, which would soon be suppressed. Meanwhile, the makeshift Greek navy was achieving success against the Ottoman navy in the Aegean Sea and prevented Ottoman reinforcements from arriving by sea. In 1822 and 1824 the Turks and Egyptians ravaged the islands, including Chios and Psara, committing wholesale massacres of the population. Approximately three-quarters of the Chios' Greek population of 120,000 were killed, enslaved or died of disease. This had the effect of galvanizing public opinion in western Europe in favour of the Greek rebels.

Tensions soon developed among different Greek factions, leading to two consecutive civil wars. Meanwhile the Ottoman Sultan negotiated with Mehmet Ali of Egypt, who agreed to send his son Ibrahim Pasha to Greece with an army to suppress the revolt in return for territorial gain. Ibrahim landed in the Peloponnese in February 1825 and had immediate success: by the end of 1825, most of the Peloponnese was under Egyptian control, and the city of Missolonghi—put under siege by the Turks since April 1825—fell in April 1826. Although Ibrahim was defeated in Mani, he had succeeded in suppressing most of the revolt in the Peloponnese, and Athens had been retaken.

After years of negotiation, three great powers, France, Russian Empire, and the United Kingdom, decided to intervene in the conflict and each nation sent a navy to Greece. Following news that combined Ottoman–Egyptian fleets were going to attack the Greek island of Hydra, the allied fleet intercepted the Ottoman–Egyptian fleet at Navarino. A week-long standoff ended with the Battle of Navarino (20 October 1827) which resulted in the destruction of the Ottoman–Egyptian fleet. A French expeditionary force was dispatched to supervise the evacuation of the Egyptian army from the Peloponnese, while the Greeks proceeded to the captured part of Central Greece by 1828. As a result of years of negotiation, the nascent Greek state was finally recognised under the London Protocol in 1830.

Kingdom of Greece

In 1827, Ioannis Kapodistrias, from Corfu, was chosen by the Third National Assembly at Troezen as the first governor of the First Hellenic Republic. Kapodistrias established a series of state, economic and military institutions. Soon tensions appeared between him and local interests. Following his assassination in 1831 and the subsequent London conference a year later, the Great Powers of Britain, France and Russia installed Bavarian Prince Otto von Wittelsbach as monarch. Otto's reign was despotic, and in its first 11 years of independence Greece was ruled by a Bavarian oligarchy led by Joseph Ludwig von Armansperg as Prime Minister and, later, by Otto himself, who held the title of both King and Premier. Throughout this period Greece remained under the influence of its three protecting great powers, France, Russia, and the United Kingdom, as well as Bavaria. In 1843 an uprising forced Otto to grant a constitution and a representative assembly.

Despite the absolutism of Otto's reign, the early years proved instrumental in creating institutions (improving those established by Ioannis Kapodisrias) which are still the bedrock of Greek administration and education. Important steps were taken in areas including the education system, maritime and postal communications, effective civil administration and, most importantly, the legal code. Historical revisionism took the form of de-Byzantinification and de-Ottomanisation, in favour of promoting the country's Ancient Greek heritage. In this spirit, the national capital was moved from Nafplio, where it had been since 1829, to Athens, which was at the time a smaller town. Religious reform also took place, and the Church of Greece was established as Greece's national church, although Otto remained a Catholic. 25 March, the day of Annunciation, was chosen as the anniversary of the Greek War of Independence to reinforce the link between Greek identity and Orthodoxy. Pavlos Karolidis called the Bavarian efforts to create a modern state in Greece as "not only appropriate for the peoples' needs, but also based on excellent administrative principles of the era".

Otto was deposed in the 23 October 1862 Revolution. Multiple causes led to his deposition and exile, including the Bavarian-dominated government, heavy taxation, and a failed attempt to annex Crete from the Ottoman Empire. The catalyst for the revolt was Otto's dismissal of Konstantinos Kanaris from the Premiership. A year later, he was replaced by Prince Wilhelm (William) of Denmark, who took the name George I and brought with him the Ionian Islands as a coronation gift from Britain. A new Constitution in 1864 changed Greece's form of government from constitutional monarchy to the more democratic crowned republic. In 1875 the concept of parliamentary majority as a requirement for the formation of a government was introduced by Charilaos Trikoupis, curbing the power of the monarchy to appoint minority governments of its preference.

Corruption, coupled with Trikoupis' increased spending to fund infrastructure projects like the Corinth Canal, overtaxed the weak Greek economy and forced the declaration of public insolvency in 1893. Greece also accepted the imposition of an International Financial Control authority to pay off the country's debtors.

All Greeks were united, however, in their determination to liberate the Hellenic lands under Ottoman rule. Especially in Crete, a prolonged revolt in 1866–1869 had raised nationalist fervour. When war broke out between Russia and the Ottomans in 1877, Greek popular sentiment rallied to Russia's side, but Greece was too poor and too concerned about British intervention, to officially enter the war. Nevertheless, in 1881, Thessaly and small parts of Epirus were ceded to Greece as part of the Treaty of Berlin, while frustrating Greek hopes of receiving Crete.

Greeks in Crete continued to stage regular revolts, and in 1897, the Greek government under Theodoros Deligiannis, bowing to popular pressure, declared war on the Ottomans. In the ensuing Greco-Turkish War of 1897, the badly trained and equipped Greek army was defeated by the Ottomans. Through the intervention of the Great Powers, however, Greece lost only a little territory along the border to Turkey, while Crete was established as an autonomous state under Prince George of Greece. With state coffers empty, fiscal policy came under International Financial Control. Alarmed by the abortive Ilinden uprising of the autonomist Internal Macedonian Revolutionary Organization (IMRO) in 1903, the Greek government, aiming to quell Komitadjis (IMRO bands) and detach the Slavophone peasants of the region from Bulgarian influence, sponsored a guerrilla campaign in Ottoman-ruled Macedonia, led by Greek officers and known as the Macedonian Struggle, which ended with the Young Turk Revolution in 1908.

Expansion, disaster, and reconstruction 

Amidst general dissatisfaction with the seeming inertia and unattainability of national aspirations under the premiership of the cautious reformist Theotokis, a group of military officers organised a coup in August 1909 and shortly thereafter called to Athens Cretan politician Eleftherios Venizelos, who conveyed a vision of national regeneration. After winning two elections and becoming Prime Minister in 1910, Venizelos initiated wide-ranging fiscal, social, and constitutional reforms, reorganised the military, made Greece a member of the Balkan League, and led the country through the Balkan Wars. By 1913, Greece's territory and population had almost doubled, annexing Crete, Epirus, and Macedonia. In the following years, the struggle between King Constantine I and charismatic Venizelos over the country's foreign policy on the eve of First World War dominated the country's political scene and divided the country into two opposing groups. During parts of WW1, Greece had two governments: A royalist pro-German one in Athens and a Venizelist pro-Entente one in Thessaloniki. The two governments were united in 1917, when Greece officially entered the war on the side of the Entente.

In the aftermath of World War I, Greece attempted further expansion into Asia Minor, a region with a large native Greek population at the time, but was defeated in the Greco-Turkish War of 1919–1922, contributing to a massive flight of Asia Minor Greeks. These events overlapped, with both happening during the Greek genocide (1914–1922), a period during which, according to various sources, Ottoman and Turkish officials contributed to the death of several hundred thousand Asia Minor Greeks, along with similar numbers of Assyrians and a rather larger number of Armenians. The resultant Greek exodus from Asia Minor was made permanent, and expanded, in an official Population exchange between Greece and Turkey. The exchange was part of the terms of the Treaty of Lausanne which ended the war.

The following era was marked by instability, as over 1.5 million propertyless Greek refugees from Turkey had to be integrated into Greek society. Cappadocian Greeks, Pontian Greeks, and non-Greek followers of Greek Orthodoxy were all subject to the exchange as well. Some of the refugees could not speak the language and were from what had been unfamiliar environments to mainland Greeks, such as in the case of the Cappadocians and non-Greeks. The refugees also made a dramatic post-war population boost, as the number of refugees was more than a quarter of Greece's prior population.

Following the catastrophic events in Asia Minor, the monarchy was abolished via a referendum in 1924 and the Second Hellenic Republic was declared. In 1935, a royalist general-turned-politician Georgios Kondylis took power after a coup d'état and abolished the republic, holding a rigged referendum, after which King George II returned to Greece and was restored to the throne.

Dictatorship, World War II, and reconstruction 

An agreement between Prime Minister Ioannis Metaxas and the head of state George II followed in 1936, which installed Metaxas as the head of a dictatorial regime known as the 4th of August Regime, inaugurating a period of authoritarian rule that would last, with short breaks, until 1974. Although a dictatorship, Greece remained on good terms with Britain and was not allied with the Axis.

On 28 October 1940, Fascist Italy demanded the surrender of Greece, but the Greek administration refused, and, in the following Greco-Italian War, Greece repelled Italian forces into Albania, giving the Allies their first victory over Axis forces on land. The Greek struggle and victory against the Italians received exuberant praise at the time. French general Charles de Gaulle was among those who praised the fierceness of the Greek resistance. In an official notice released to coincide with the Greek national celebration of the Day of Independence, De Gaulle expressed his admiration for the Greek resistance:In the name of the captured yet still alive French people, France wants to send her greetings to the Greek people who are fighting for their freedom. The 25 March 1941 finds Greece in the peak of their heroic struggle and in the top of their glory. Since the Battle of Salamis, Greece had not achieved the greatness and the glory which today holds. The country would eventually fall to urgently dispatched German forces during the Battle of Greece, despite the fierce Greek resistance, particularly in the Battle of the Metaxas Line. Adolf Hitler himself recognised the bravery and the courage of the Greek army, stating in his address to the Reichstag on 11 December 1941, that: "Historical justice obliges me to state that of the enemies who took up positions against us, the Greek soldier particularly fought with the highest courage. He capitulated only when further resistance had become impossible and useless."

The Nazis proceeded to administer Athens and Thessaloniki, while other regions of the country were given to Nazi Germany's partners, Fascist Italy and Bulgaria. The occupation brought about terrible hardships for the Greek civilian population. Over 100,000 civilians died of starvation during the winter of 1941–1942, tens of thousands more died because of reprisals by Nazis and collaborators, the country's economy was ruined, and the great majority of Greek Jews (tens of thousands) were deported and murdered in Nazi concentration camps. The Greek Resistance, one of the most effective resistance movements in Europe, fought vehemently against the Nazis and their collaborators. The German occupiers committed numerous atrocities, mass executions, and wholesale slaughter of civilians and destruction of towns and villages in reprisals. In the course of the concerted anti-guerrilla campaign, hundreds of villages were systematically torched and almost 1 million Greeks left homeless. In total, the Germans executed some 21,000 Greeks, the Bulgarians 40,000, and the Italians 9,000.

Following liberation and the Allied victory over the Axis, Greece annexed the Dodecanese Islands from Italy and regained Western Thrace from Bulgaria. The country almost immediately descended into a bloody civil war between communist forces and the anti-communist Greek government, which lasted until 1949 with the latter's victory. The conflict, considered one of the earliest struggles of the Cold War, resulted in further economic devastation, mass population displacement and severe political polarisation for the next thirty years.

Although the post-war decades were characterised by social strife and widespread marginalisation of the left in political and social spheres, Greece nonetheless experienced rapid economic growth and recovery, propelled in part by the U.S.-administered Marshall Plan. In 1952, Greece joined NATO, reinforcing its membership in the Western Bloc of the Cold War.

Military regime (1967–1974)
King Constantine II's dismissal of George Papandreou's centrist government in July 1965 prompted a prolonged period of political turbulence, which culminated in a coup d'état on 21 April 1967 by the Regime of the Colonels. Under the junta, civil rights were suspended, political repression was intensified, and human rights abuses, including state-sanctioned torture, were rampant. Economic growth remained rapid before plateauing in 1972. The brutal suppression of the Athens Polytechnic uprising on 17 November 1973 set in motion the events that caused the fall of the Papadopoulos regime, resulting in a counter-coup which overthrew Georgios Papadopoulos and established brigadier Dimitrios Ioannidis as the new junta strongman. On 20 July 1974, Turkey invaded the island of Cyprus in response to a Greek-backed Cypriot coup, triggering a political crisis in Greece that led to the regime's collapse and the restoration of democracy through Metapolitefsi.

Third Hellenic Republic 

The former prime minister Konstantinos Karamanlis was invited back from Paris where he had lived in self-exile since 1963, marking the beginning of the Metapolitefsi era. The first multiparty elections since 1964 were held on the first anniversary of the Polytechnic uprising. A democratic and republican constitution was promulgated on 11 June 1975 following a referendum which chose to not restore the monarchy.

Meanwhile, Andreas Papandreou, George Papandreou's son, founded the Panhellenic Socialist Movement (PASOK) in response to Karamanlis's conservative New Democracy party, with the two political formations dominating in government over the next four decades. Greece rejoined NATO in 1980. Greece became the tenth member of the European Communities (subsequently subsumed by the European Union) on 1 January 1981, ushering in a period of sustained growth. Widespread investments in industrial enterprises and heavy infrastructure, as well as funds from the European Union and growing revenues from tourism, shipping, and a fast-growing service sector raised the country's standard of living to unprecedented levels. The country adopted the euro in 2001 and successfully hosted the 2004 Summer Olympic Games in Athens.

Beginning in 2010, Greece suffered substantially from the Great Recession and the related European sovereign debt crisis. Due to the adoption of the euro, when Greece experienced a financial crisis, it could no longer devalue its currency to regain competitiveness. Youth unemployment was especially high during this period. This Greek government-debt crisis, and subsequent austerity policies, resulted in protests and social strife. The crisis is generally considered to have ended around 2018, with the end of the bailout mechanisms and the return of economic growth. In March 2020 Greece's parliament elected a non-partisan candidate, Ekaterini Sakellaropoulou, as the first female President of Greece.

Geography 

Located in Southern and Southeast Europe, Greece consists of a mountainous, peninsular mainland jutting out into the sea at the southern end of the Balkans, ending at the Peloponnese peninsula (separated from the mainland by the canal of the Isthmus of Corinth) and strategically located at the crossroads of Europe, Asia, and Africa. The country lies approximately between latitudes 34° and 42° N, and longitudes 19° and 30° E, with the extreme points being:
North: Ormenio village
South: Gavdos island
East: Strongyli (Kastelorizo, Megisti) island
West: Othonoi island

Eighty percent of Greece consists of mountains or hills, making the country one of the most mountainous in Europe. Mount Olympus, the mythical abode of the Greek Gods, culminates at Mytikas peak , the highest in the country. Western Greece contains a number of lakes and wetlands and is dominated by the Pindus mountain range.

The Pindus range continues through the central Peloponnese, crosses the islands of Kythera and Antikythera and finds its way into southwestern Aegean, in the island of Crete where it eventually ends. The islands of the Aegean are peaks of underwater mountains that once constituted an extension of the mainland. Pindus is characterised by its high, steep peaks, often dissected by numerous canyons and a variety of other karstic landscapes. The spectacular Vikos Gorge, part of the Vikos-Aoos National Park in the Pindus range, is listed by the Guinness book of World Records as the deepest gorge in the world. Another notable formation are the Meteora rock pillars, atop which have been built medieval Greek Orthodox monasteries.

Northeastern Greece features another high-altitude mountain range, the Rhodope range, spreading across the region of East Macedonia and Thrace; this area is covered with vast, thick, ancient forests, including the famous Dadia Forest in the Evros regional unit, in the far northeast of the country.

Extensive plains are primarily located in the regions of Thessaly, Central Macedonia and Thrace. They constitute key economic regions as they are among the few arable places in the country. Rare marine species such as the pinniped seals and the loggerhead sea turtle live in the seas surrounding mainland Greece, while its dense forests are home to the endangered brown bear, the Eurasian lynx, the roe deer and the wild goat.

Islands 

Greece features a vast number of islands—between 1,200 and 6,000, depending on the definition, 227 of which are inhabited—and is considered a non-contiguous transcontinental country. Crete is the largest and most populous island; Euboea, separated from the mainland by the 60 m-wide Euripus Strait, is the second largest, followed by Lesbos and Rhodes.

The Greek islands are traditionally grouped into the following clusters: the Argo-Saronic Islands in the Saronic gulf near Athens; the Cyclades, a large but dense collection occupying the central part of the Aegean Sea; the North Aegean islands, a loose grouping off the west coast of Turkey; the Dodecanese, another loose collection in the southeast between Crete and Turkey; the Sporades, a small tight group off the coast of northeast Euboea; and the Ionian Islands, located to the west of the mainland in the Ionian Sea.

Climate 

The climate of Greece is primarily Mediterranean, featuring mild, wet winters and hot, dry summers. This climate occurs at all coastal locations, including Athens, the Cyclades, the Dodecanese, Crete, the Peloponnese, the Ionian Islands and parts of the Central Continental Greece region. The Pindus mountain range strongly affects the climate of the country, as areas to the west of the range are considerably wetter on average (due to greater exposure to south-westerly systems bringing in moisture) than the areas lying to the east of the range (due to a rain shadow effect).

The mountainous areas of northwestern Greece (parts of Epirus, Central Greece, Thessaly, Western Macedonia) as well as in the mountainous central parts of Peloponnese – including parts of the regional units of Achaea, Arcadia and Laconia – feature an Alpine climate with heavy snowfalls. The inland parts of northern Greece, in Central Macedonia and East Macedonia and Thrace feature a temperate climate with cold, damp winters and hot, dry summers with frequent thunderstorms. Snowfalls occur every year in the mountains and northern areas, and brief snowfalls are not unknown even in low-lying southern areas, such as Athens.

Biodiversity 

Phytogeographically, Greece belongs to the Boreal Kingdom and is shared between the East Mediterranean province of the Mediterranean Region and the Illyrian province of the Circumboreal Region. According to the World Wide Fund for Nature and the European Environment Agency, the territory of Greece can be subdivided into six ecoregions: the Illyrian deciduous forests, Pindus Mountains mixed forests, Balkan mixed forests, Rhodope montane mixed forests, Aegean and Western Turkey sclerophyllous and mixed forests, and Crete Mediterranean forests. It had a 2018 Forest Landscape Integrity Index mean score of 6.6/10, ranking it 70th globally out of 172 countries.

Politics 

Greece is a unitary parliamentary republic. The current Constitution was drawn up and adopted by the Fifth Revisionary Parliament of the Hellenes and entered into force in 1975 after the fall of the military junta of 1967–1974. It has been revised three times since: in 1986, 2001, 2008 and 2019. The Constitution, which consists of 120 articles, provides for a separation of powers into executive, legislative, and judicial branches, and grants extensive specific guarantees (further reinforced in 2001) of civil liberties and social rights. Women's suffrage was guaranteed with an amendment to the 1952 Constitution.

The nominal head of state is the President of the Republic, who is elected by the Parliament for a five-year term. According to the Constitution, executive power is exercised by the President and the Government. However, the Constitutional amendment of 1986 curtailed the President's duties and powers to a significant extent, rendering the position largely ceremonial; most political power is thus vested in the Prime Minister, Greece's head of government. The position is filled by the current leader of the political party that can obtain a vote of confidence by the Parliament. The president of the republic formally appoints the prime minister and, on their recommendation, appoints and dismisses the other members of the Cabinet.

Legislative powers are exercised by a 300-member elective unicameral Parliament. Statutes passed by the Parliament are promulgated by the President of the Republic. Parliamentary elections are held every four years, but the President of the Republic is obliged to dissolve the Parliament earlier on the proposal of the Cabinet, in view of dealing with a national issue of exceptional importance. The President is also obliged to dissolve the Parliament earlier if the opposition manages to pass a motion of no confidence. The voting age is 17.

According to a 2016 report by the OECD, Greeks display a moderate level of civic participation compared to most other developed countries; voter turnout was 64 percent during recent elections, lower than the OECD average of 69 percent.

Political parties 

Since the restoration of democracy, the Greek party system was dominated by the liberal-conservative New Democracy (ND) and the social-democratic Panhellenic Socialist Movement (PASOK). Other parties represented in the Hellenic Parliament include the Coalition of the Radical Left (SYRIZA), the Communist Party of Greece (KKE), Greek Solution and MeRA25.

PASOK and New Democracy largely alternated in power until the outbreak of the government-debt crisis in 2009. From that time, the two major parties, New Democracy and PASOK, experienced a sharp decline in popularity. In November 2011, the two major parties joined the smaller Popular Orthodox Rally in a grand coalition, pledging their parliamentary support for a government of national unity headed by former European Central Bank vice-president Lucas Papademos. Panos Kammenos voted against this government and he split off from ND forming the right-wing populist Independent Greeks. 

The coalition government led the country to the parliamentary elections of May 2012. The power of the traditional Greek political parties, PASOK and New Democracy, declined from 43% to 13% and from 33% to 18%, respectively. The left-wing SYRIZA became the second major party with an increase from 4% to 16%. No party could form a sustainable government, which led to the parliamentary elections of June 2012. The result of the second elections was the formation of a coalition government composed of New Democracy (29%), PASOK (12%) and Democratic Left (6%) parties.

SYRIZA has since overtaken PASOK as the main party of the centre-left . Alexis Tsipras led SYRIZA to victory in the general election held on 25 January 2015, falling short of an outright majority in Parliament by just two seats. The following morning, Tsipras reached an agreement with Independent Greeks party to form a coalition and was sworn in as Prime Minister of Greece. Tsipras called snap elections in August 2015 after resigning from his post, which led to a month-long caretaker administration headed by judge Vassiliki Thanou-Christophilou, Greece's first female prime minister. In the September 2015 general election, Alexis Tsipras led SYRIZA to another victory, winning 145 out of 300 seats and re-forming the coalition with the Independent Greeks. However, he was defeated in the July 2019 general election by Kyriakos Mitsotakis who leads New Democracy. On 7 July 2019, Kyriakos Mitsotakis was sworn in as the new Prime Minister of Greece. He formed a centre-right government after the landslide victory of his New Democracy party.

Foreign relations 

Greece's foreign policy is conducted through the Ministry of Foreign Affairs and its head, the Minister for Foreign Affairs, currently Nikos Dendias. Officially, the main aims of the Ministry are to represent Greece before other states and international organizations; safeguard the interests of the Greek state and of its citizens abroad; promote Greek culture; foster closer relations with the Greek diaspora; and encourage international cooperation. Greece is described as having a special relationship with Cyprus, Italy, France, Armenia, Australia, the State of Israel, the United States and the United Kingdom.

Following the resolution of the Macedonia naming dispute with the Prespa agreement in 2018, the Ministry identifies two remaining issues of particular importance to the Greek state: Turkish challenges to Greek sovereignty rights in the Aegean Sea and corresponding airspace and the Cyprus dispute involving the Turkish occupation of Northern Cyprus.

There is a long-standing conflict between Turkey and Greece over natural resources in the eastern Mediterranean. Turkey doesn't recognize a legal continental shelf and exclusive economic zone around the Greek islands.

Additionally, due to its political and geographical proximity to Europe, Asia, the Middle East and Africa, Greece is a country of significant geostrategic importance, which it has leveraged to develop a regional policy to help promote peace and stability in the Balkans, the Mediterranean, and the Middle East. This has accorded the country middle power status in global affairs.

Greece is a member of numerous international organizations, including the Council of Europe, the European Union, the Union for the Mediterranean, the North Atlantic Treaty Organization, the Organisation internationale de la francophonie and the United Nations, of which it is a founding member.

Military 

The Hellenic Armed Forces are overseen by the Hellenic National Defense General Staff (Greek: Γενικό Επιτελείο Εθνικής Άμυνας – ΓΕΕΘΑ), with civilian authority vested in the Ministry of National Defence. It consists of three branches:
 Hellenic Army (Ellinikos Stratos, ES)
 Hellenic Navy (Elliniko Polemiko Navtiko, EPN)
 Hellenic Air Force (Elliniki Polemiki Aeroporia, EPA)

Moreover, Greece maintains the Hellenic Coast Guard for law enforcement at sea, search and rescue, and port operations. Though it can support the navy during wartime, it resides under the authority of the Ministry of Shipping.

Greek military personnel total 364,050, of whom 142,700 are active and 221,350 are reserve. Greece ranks 28th in the world in the number of citizens serving in the armed forces. Mandatory military service is generally one year for 19 to 45 year olds. Additionally, Greek males between the ages of 18 and 60 who live in strategically sensitive areas may be required to serve part-time in the National Guard.

As a member of NATO, the Greek military participates in exercises and deployments under the auspices of the alliance, although its involvement in NATO missions is minimal. Greece spends over US$7 billion annually on its military, or 2.3 percent of GDP, the 24th-highest in the world in absolute terms, the seventh-highest on a per capita basis, and the second-highest in NATO after the United States. Moreover, Greece is one of only five NATO countries to meet or surpass the minimum defence spending target of 2 percent of GDP.

Law and justice 

The judiciary is independent of the executive and the legislature and comprises three Supreme Courts: the Court of Cassation (Άρειος Πάγος), the Council of State (Συμβούλιο της Επικρατείας) and the Court of Auditors (Ελεγκτικό Συνέδριο). The Judiciary system is also composed of civil courts, which judge civil and penal cases and administrative courts, which judge disputes between the citizens and the Greek administrative authorities.

The Hellenic Police is the national police force of Greece. It is a very large agency with its responsibilities ranging from road traffic control to counter-terrorism. It was established in 1984 under Law 1481/1-10-1984 (Government Gazette 152 A) as the result of the fusion of the Gendarmerie (Χωροφυλακή, Chorofylaki) and the Cities Police (Αστυνομία Πόλεων, Astynomia Poleon) forces.

Administrative divisions 

Since the Kallikratis programme reform entered into effect on 1 January 2011, Greece has consisted of 13 regions subdivided into a total of 325, from 2019 332 (Kleisthenis I Programme), municipalities. The 54 old prefectures and prefecture-level administrations have been largely retained as sub-units of the regions. Seven decentralised administrations group one to three regions for administrative purposes on a regional basis. There is also one autonomous area, Mount Athos ("Holy Mountain"), which borders the region of Central Macedonia.

Economy

Introduction 

According to World Bank statistics for the year 2013, the economy of Greece is the 43rd largest by nominal gross domestic product at $242 billion and 53rd largest by purchasing power parity (PPP) at $284 billion. Additionally, Greece is the 15th largest economy in the 27-member European Union. In terms of per capita income, Greece is ranked 41st or 47th in the world at $18,168 and $29,045 for nominal GDP and PPP respectively. The Greek economy is classified as advanced and high-income.

Greece is a developed country with a high standard of living and a high ranking in the Human Development Index. Its economy mainly comprises the service sector (85.0%) and industry (12.0%), while agriculture makes up 3.0% of the national economic output. Important Greek industries include tourism (with 14.9 million international tourists in 2009, it is ranked as the 7th most visited country in the European Union and 16th in the world by the United Nations World Tourism Organization) and merchant shipping (at 16.2% of the world's total capacity, the Greek merchant marine is the largest in the world), while the country is also a considerable agricultural producer (including fisheries) within the union.

In October 2021 unemployment stood at 12.9% and youth unemployment at 33.2%, compared with respectively 7% and 15.9% in the EU and in the Euro zone.

Greece has the largest economy in the Balkans, and an important regional investor. Greece is the number-two foreign investor of capital in Albania, the number-three foreign investor in Bulgaria, at the top-three of foreign investors in Romania and Serbia and the most important trading partner and largest foreign investor of North Macedonia. Greek banks open a new branch somewhere in the Balkans on an almost weekly basis. The Greek telecommunications company OTE has become a strong investor in other Balkan countries.

Greece was a founding member of the Organisation for Economic Co-operation and Development (OECD) and the Organization of the Black Sea Economic Cooperation (BSEC). In 1979 the accession of the country in the European Communities and the single market was signed, and the process was completed in 1982. Greece was accepted into the Economic and Monetary Union of the European Union on 19 June 2000, and in January 2001 adopted the euro as its currency, replacing the Greek drachma at an exchange rate of 340.75 drachma to the Euro. Greece is also a member of the International Monetary Fund and the World Trade Organization, and is ranked 24th on the KOF Globalization Index for 2013.

Debt crisis (2010–2018) 

The Greek economy had fared well for much of the 20th century, with high growth rates and low public debt. Even until the eve of the financial crisis of 2007–2008, it featured high rates of growth, which, however, were coupled with high structural deficits, thus maintaining a (roughly unchanged throughout this period) public debt to GDP ratio of just over 100%. In 2009, after an election and change in government, it was revealed that Greece's budget deficit had for years been considerably higher than the officially reported figures. In the years before the crisis, Goldman Sachs, JPMorgan Chase and numerous other banks had developed financial products which enabled the governments of Greece, Italy, and many other European countries to hide their levels of borrowing. Dozens of similar agreements were concluded across Europe whereby banks supplied cash in advance in exchange for future payments by the governments involved; in turn, the liabilities of the involved countries were "kept off the books". These conditions had enabled Greece as well as other European governments to spend beyond their means, while still technically meeting the deficit targets set out in the Maastricht Treaty.

The Greek crisis was triggered by the turmoil of the 2007–2009 Great Recession, which caused Greece's GDP to contract by around 2.5% in 2009. Simultaneously, the higher-than-believed budget deficits in the preceding years were revealed to have been allowed to reach 10.2% and 15.1% of GDP in 2008 and 2009, respectively. This caused Greece's debt to GDP ratio (which had been high but stable at just over 100% until 2007, as calculated after all corrections) to spike to 127%. In addition, being a member of the Eurozone, the country had essentially no autonomous monetary policy flexibility. 
Consequently, Greece was "punished" by the markets which increased borrowing rates, making it impossible for the country to finance its debt since early 2010.

In May 2010, the Greece's deficit was again revised and estimated to be 13.6% the second highest in the world relative to GDP. Public debt was forecast to reach up to 120% of GDP in the same year, causing a crisis of confidence in Greece's ability pay back loans.

To avert a sovereign default, Greece, the other Eurozone members, and the International Monetary Fund agreed on a rescue package which involved giving Greece an immediate € in loans, with additional funds to follow, totaling €. To secure the funding, Greece was required to adopt harsh austerity measures to bring its deficit under control. A second bail-out amounting to € ($) was agreed in 2012, subject to strict conditions, including financial reforms and further austerity measures. A debt haircut was also agreed as part of the deal. Greece achieved a primary government budget surplus in 2013, while in April 2014, it returned to the global bond market. Greece returned to growth after six years of economic decline in the second quarter of 2014, and was the Eurozone's fastest-growing economy in the third quarter. A third bailout was agreed in July 2015, after a confrontation with the newly elected government of Alexis Tsipras.

Partly due to the imposed austerity measures, Greece experienced a 25% drop GDP between 2009 and 2015. This had a critical effect: the debt-to-GDP ratio, a key factor defining the severity of the crisis, would jump from its 2009 level of 127% to about 170%, solely due to the shrinking economy. In a 2013 report, the IMF admitted that it had underestimated the effects of so extensive tax hikes and budget cuts on the country's GDP and issued an informal apology. The Greek programmes imposed a very rapid improvement in structural primary balance (at least two times faster than for other Eurozone bailed-out countries). The policies have been blamed for worsening the crisis, while Greece's president, Prokopis Pavlopoulos, stressed the creditors' share in responsibility for the depth of the crisis. Greek Prime Minister, Alexis Tsipras, asserted that errors in the design of the first two programmes which led to a loss of 25% of the Greek economy due to the harsh imposition of excessive austerity.

Between 2009 and 2017 the Greek government debt rose from €300 bn to €318 bn, i.e. by only about 6% (thanks, in part, to the 2012 debt restructuring); however, during the same period, the critical debt-to-GDP ratio shot up from 127% to 179% basically due to the severe GDP drop during the handling of the crisis.

Greece's bailouts successfully ended (as declared) on 20 August 2018.

Agriculture 

In 2010, Greece was the European Union's largest producer of cotton (183,800 tons) and pistachios (8,000 tons) and ranked second in the production of rice (229,500 tons) and olives (147,500 tons), third in the production of figs (11,000 tons), almonds (44,000 tons), tomatoes (1,400,000 tons), and watermelons (578,400 tons) and fourth in the production of tobacco (22,000 tons). Agriculture contributes 3.8% of the country's GDP and employs 12.4% of the country's labor force.

Greece is a major beneficiary of the EU's Common Agricultural Policy. As a result of the country's entry to the European Community, much of its agricultural infrastructure has been upgraded and agricultural output increased. Between 2000 and 2007, organic farming in Greece increased by 885%, the highest change percentage in the EU.

Energy 

Electricity production in Greece is dominated by the state-owned Public Power Corporation (known mostly by its acronym ΔΕΗ, transliterated as DEI). In 2009 DEI supplied for 85.6% of all electric energy demand in Greece, while the number fell to 77.3% in 2010. Almost half (48%) of DEI's power output is generated using lignite, a drop from the 51.6% in 2009.

Twelve percent of Greece's electricity comes from hydroelectric power plants and another 20% from natural gas. Between 2009 and 2010, independent companies' energy production increased by 56%, from 2,709 gigawatt hour in 2009 to 4,232 GWh in 2010.

In 2012, renewable energy accounted for 13.8% of the country's total energy consumption, a rise from the 10.6% it accounted for in 2011, a figure almost equal to the EU average of 14.1% in 2012. 10% of the country's renewable energy comes from solar power, while most comes from biomass and waste recycling. In line with the European Commission's Directive on Renewable Energy, Greece aims to get 18% of its energy from renewable sources by 2020.

In 2013, according to the independent power transmission operator in Greece (ΑΔΜΗΕ) more than 20% of the electricity in Greece has been produced from renewable energy sources and hydroelectric powerplants. This percentage in April reached 42%. Greece currently does not have any nuclear power plants in operation; however, in 2009 the Academy of Athens suggested that research in the possibility of Greek nuclear power plants begin.

Maritime industry 

The shipping industry has been a key element of Greek economic activity since ancient times. Shipping remains one of the country's most important industries, accounting for 4.5 percent of GDP, employing about 160,000 people (4 percent of the workforce), and representing a third of the trade deficit.

According to a 2011 report by the United Nations Conference on Trade and Development, the Greek Merchant Navy is the largest in the world at 16.2 percent of total global capacity, up from 15.96 percent in 2010 but below the peak of 18.2 percent in 2006. The country's merchant fleet ranks first in total tonnage (202 million dwt), fourth in total number of ships (at 3,150), first in both tankers and dry bulk carriers, fourth in the number of containers, and fifth in other ships. However, today's fleet roster is smaller than an all-time high of 5,000 ships in the late 1970s. Additionally, the total number of ships flying a Greek flag (includes non-Greek fleets) is 1,517, or 5.3 percent of the world's dwt (ranked fifth globally).

During the 1960s, the size of the Greek fleet nearly doubled, primarily through the investment undertaken by the shipping magnates, Aristotle Onassis and Stavros Niarchos. The basis of the modern Greek maritime industry was formed after World War II when Greek shipping businessmen were able to amass surplus ships sold to them by the U.S. government through the Ship Sales Act of the 1940s.

Greece has a significant shipbuilding and ship maintenance industry. The six shipyards around the port of Piraeus are among the largest in Europe. In recent years, Greece has also become a leader in the construction and maintenance of luxury yachts.

Tourism 

Tourism has been a key element of the economic activity in the country and one of the country's most important sectors, contributing 20.6% of the gross domestic product as of 2018. Greece welcomed over 31.3 million visitors in 2019, and around 28 million in 2016, which is an increase from the 26.5 million tourists it welcomed in 2015 and the 19.5 million in 2009, and the 17.7 million tourists in 2007, making Greece one of the most visited countries in Europe in the recent years.

The vast majority of visitors in Greece in 2007 came from the European continent, numbering 12.7 million, while the most visitors from a single nationality were those from the United Kingdom, (2.6 million), followed closely by those from Germany (2.3 million). In 2010, the most visited region of Greece was that of Central Macedonia, with 18% of the country's total tourist flow (amounting to 3.6 million tourists), followed by Attica with 2.6 million and the Peloponnese with 1.8 million. Northern Greece is the country's most-visited geographical region, with 6.5 million tourists, while Central Greece is second with 6.3 million.

In 2010, Lonely Planet ranked Greece's northern and second-largest city of Thessaloniki as the world's fifth-best party town worldwide, comparable with cities such as Dubai and Montreal. In 2011, Santorini was voted as "The World's Best Island" in Travel + Leisure. Its neighboring island Mykonos, came in fifth in the European category. There are 18 UNESCO World Heritage Sites in Greece, and Greece is ranked 16th in the world in terms of total sites. 14 further sites are on the tentative list, awaiting nomination.

Transport 

Since the 1980s, the road and rail network of Greece has been significantly modernised. Important works include the A2 (Egnatia Odos) motorway, that connects northwestern Greece (Igoumenitsa) with northern Greece (Thessaloniki) and northeastern Greece (Kipoi); the Rio–Antirrio bridge, the longest suspension cable bridge in Europe ( long), connecting the Peloponnese (Rio,  from Patras) with Aetolia-Akarnania (Antirrio) in western Greece.

Also completed are the A5 (Ionia Odos) motorway that connects northwestern Greece (Ioannina) with western Greece (Antirrio); the last sections of the A1 motorway, connecting Athens to Thessaloniki and Evzonoi in northern Greece; as well as the A8 motorway (part of the Olympia Odos) in Peloponnese, connecting Athens to Patras. The remaining section of Olympia Odos, connecting Patras with Pyrgos, is under planning.

Other important projects that are currently underway, include the construction of the Thessaloniki Metro.

The Athens Metropolitan Area in particular is served by some of the most modern and efficient transport infrastructure in Europe, such as the Athens International Airport, the privately run A6 (Attiki Odos) motorway network and the expanded Athens Metro system.

Most of the Greek islands and many main cities of Greece are connected by air mainly from the two major Greek airlines, Olympic Air and Aegean Airlines. Maritime connections have been improved with modern high-speed craft, including hydrofoils and catamarans.

Railway connections play a somewhat lesser role in Greece than in many other European countries, but they too have also been expanded, with new suburban/commuter rail connections, serviced by Proastiakos around Athens, towards its airport, Kiato and Chalkida; around Thessaloniki, towards the cities of Larissa and Edessa; and around Patras. A modern intercity rail connection between Athens and Thessaloniki has also been established, while an upgrade to double lines in many parts of the  network is underway; along with a new double track, standard gauge railway between Athens and Patras (replacing the old metre-gauge Piraeus–Patras railway) which is currently under construction and opening in stages. International railway lines connect Greek cities with the rest of Europe, the Balkans and Turkey.

Telecommunications 

Modern digital information and communication networks reach all areas. Broadband internet availability is widespread in Greece: there were a total of 2,252,653 broadband connections , translating to 20% broadband penetration. According to 2017 data, around 82% of the general population used the internet regularly.

Internet cafés that provide net access, office applications and multiplayer gaming are also a common sight in the country, while mobile internet on 3G and 4G- LTE cellphone networks and Wi-Fi connections can be found almost everywhere. 3G/4G mobile internet usage has been on a sharp increase in recent years. Based on 2016 data 70% of Greek internet users have access via 3G/4G mobile. As of July 2022, 5G service is accessible in most of major Greek cities. The United Nations International Telecommunication Union ranks Greece among the top 30 countries with a highly developed information and communications infrastructure.

Science and technology 

The General Secretariat for Research and Technology of the Ministry of Development and Competitiveness is responsible for designing, implementing and supervising national research and technological policy. In 2017, spending on research and development (R&D) reached an all-time high of €2 billion, equal to 1.14 percent of GDP.

Although lower than the EU average of 1.93 percent, between 1990 and 1998, total R&D expenditure in Greece enjoyed the third-highest increase in Europe, after Finland and Ireland. Greece was ranked 47th in the Global Innovation Index in 2021, down from 41st in 2019. Because of its strategic location, qualified workforce, and political and economic stability, many multinational companies such as Ericsson, Siemens, Motorola, Coca-Cola, and Tesla have their regional R&D headquarters in Greece.

Greece has several major technology parks with incubator facilities and has been a member of the European Space Agency (ESA) since 2005. Cooperation between ESA and the Hellenic National Space Committee began in 1994 with the signing of the first cooperation agreement. After applying for full membership in 2003, Greece became the ESA's sixteenth member on 16 March 2005. The country participates in the ESA's telecommunication and technology activities and the Global Monitoring for Environment and Security Initiative.

The National Centre of Scientific Research "Demokritos" was founded in 1959. The original objective of the center was the advancement of nuclear research and technology. Today, its activities cover several fields of science and engineering.

Greece has one of the highest rates of tertiary enrollment in the world, while Greeks are well represented in academia worldwide; numerous leading Western universities employ a disproportionately high number of Greek faculty. Greek scientific publications have grown significantly in terms of research impact, surpassing both the EU and global average from 2012 to 2016.

Notable Greek scientists of modern times include Georgios Papanikolaou (inventor of the Pap test), mathematician Constantin Carathéodory (known for the Carathéodory theorems and Carathéodory conjecture), astronomer E. M. Antoniadi, archaeologists Ioannis Svoronos, Valerios Stais, Spyridon Marinatos, Manolis Andronikos (discovered the tomb of Philip II of Macedon in Vergina), Indologist Dimitrios Galanos, botanist Theodoros G. Orphanides, and scientists such as Michael Dertouzos, Nicholas Negroponte, John Argyris, John Iliopoulos (2007 Dirac Prize for his contributions on the physics of the charm quark), Joseph Sifakis (2007 Turing Award, the "Nobel Prize" of Computer Science), Christos Papadimitriou (2002 Knuth Prize, 2012 Gödel Prize), Mihalis Yannakakis (2005 Knuth Prize) and physicist Dimitri Nanopoulos.

Demographics 

According to the official statistical body of Greece, the Hellenic Statistical Authority (ELSTAT), the country's total population in 2021 was 10,432,481. Eurostat places the current population at 10.7 million in 2018.

Greek society has changed rapidly over the last several decades, coinciding with the wider European trend of declining fertility and rapid aging. The birth rate in 2003 stood at 9.5 per 1,000 inhabitants, significantly lower than the rate of 14.5 per 1,000 in 1981. At the same time, the mortality rate increased slightly from 8.9 per 1,000 inhabitants in 1981 to 9.6 per 1,000 inhabitants in 2003. Estimates from 2016 show the birth rate decreasing further still to 8.5 per 1,000 and mortality climbing to 11.2 per 1,000.

 
The fertility rate of 1.41 children per woman is well below the replacement rate of 2.1, and is one of the lowest in the world, considerably below the high of 5.47 children born per woman in 1900. Subsequently, Greece's median age is 44.2 years, the seventh-highest in the world. In 2001, 16.71 percent of the population were 65 years old and older, 68.12 percent between the ages of 15 and 64 years old, and 15.18 percent were 14 years old and younger. By 2016, the proportion of the population age 65 and older had risen to 20.68 percent, while the proportion of those aged 14 and younger declined to slightly below 14 percent.

Marriage rates began declining from almost 71 per 1,000 inhabitants in 1981 until 2002, only to increase slightly in 2003 to 61 per 1,000 and then fall again to 51 in 2004. Divorce rates have seen an increase from 191.2 per 1,000 marriages in 1991 to 239.5 per 1,000 marriages in 2004.

As a result of these trends, the average Greek household is smaller and older than in previous generations. The economic crisis has exacerbated this development, with 350,000–450,000 Greeks, predominantly young adults, emigrating since 2010.

Cities 

Almost two-thirds of the Greek people live in urban areas. Other prominent cities with urban populations above 100,000 inhabitants include Patras, Heraklion, Larissa, Volos, Rhodes, Ioannina, Agrinio, Chania, and Chalcis.

The table below lists the largest cities in Greece, by population contained in their respective contiguous built up urban areas, which are either made up of many municipalities, evident in the cases of Athens and Thessaloniki, or are contained within a larger single municipality, case evident in most of the smaller cities of the country. The results come from the preliminary figures of the population census that took place in Greece in May 2011.

Religion 

The Greek Constitution recognises Eastern Orthodoxy as the 'prevailing' faith of the country, while guaranteeing freedom of religious belief for all. The Greek government does not keep statistics on religious groups and censuses do not ask for religious affiliation. According to the U.S. State Department, an estimated 97% of Greek citizens identify themselves as Eastern Orthodox, belonging to the Greek Orthodox Church, which uses the Byzantine rite and the Greek language, the original language of the New Testament. The administration of the Greek territory is shared between the Church of Greece and the Patriarchate of Constantinople.

In a 2010 Eurostat–Eurobarometer poll, 79% of Greek citizens responded that they "believe there is a God". According to other sources, 15.8% of Greeks describe themselves as "very religious", which is the highest among all European countries. The survey also found that just 3.5% never attend a church, compared to 4.9% in Poland and 59.1% in the Czech Republic.

Estimates of the recognised Greek Muslim minority, which is mostly located in Thrace, range around 100,000, (about 1% of the population). Some of the Albanian immigrants to Greece come from a nominally Muslim background, although most are secular in orientation. Following the 1919–1922 Greco-Turkish War and the 1923 Treaty of Lausanne, Greece and Turkey agreed to a population transfer based on cultural and religious identity. About 500,000 Muslims from Greece, predominantly those defined as Turks, but also Greek Muslims like the Vallahades of western Macedonia, were exchanged with approximately 1.5 million Greeks from Turkey. However, many refugees who settled in former Ottoman Muslim villages in Central Macedonia, and were defined as Christian Orthodox Caucasus Greeks, arrived from the former Russian Transcaucasus province of Kars Oblast, after it had been retroceded to Turkey prior to the official population exchange.

Judaism has been present in Greece for more than 2,000 years.
The ancient community of Greek Jews are called Romaniotes, while the Sephardi Jews were once a prominent community in the city of Thessaloniki, numbering some 80,000, or more than half of the population, by 1900. However, after the German occupation of Greece and the Holocaust during World War II, is estimated to number around 5,500 people.

The Roman Catholic community is estimated to be around 250,000 of which 50,000 are Greek citizens. Their community is nominally separate from the smaller Greek Byzantine Catholic Church, which recognises the primacy of the Pope but maintains the liturgy of the Byzantine Rite. Old Calendarists account for 500,000 followers. Protestants, including the Greek Evangelical Church and Free Evangelical Churches, stand at about 30,000. Other Christian minorities, such as Assemblies of God, International Church of the Foursquare Gospel and various Pentecostal churches of the Greek Synod of Apostolic Church total about 12,000 members. The independent Free Apostolic Church of Pentecost is the biggest Protestant denomination in Greece with 120 churches. There are no official statistics about Free Apostolic Church of Pentecost, but the Orthodox Church estimates the followers as 20,000. The Jehovah's Witnesses report having 28,874 active members.

Since 2017, Hellenic Polytheism, or Hellenism has been legally recognised as an actively practised religion in Greece, with estimates of 2,000 active practitioners and an additional 100,000 "sympathisers". Hellenism refers to various religious movements that continue, revive, or reconstruct ancient Greek religious practices.

Languages 

The first textual evidence of the Greek language dates back to the 15th century BC and the Linear B script which is associated with the Mycenaean Civilization. Greek was a widely spoken lingua franca in the Mediterranean world and beyond during Classical Antiquity, and would eventually become the official parlance of the Byzantine Empire.

During the 19th and 20th centuries there was a major dispute known as the Greek language question, on whether the official language of Greece should be the archaic Katharevousa, created in the 19th century and used as the state and scholarly language, or the Dimotiki, the form of the Greek language which evolved naturally from Byzantine Greek and was the language of the people. The dispute was finally resolved in 1976, when Dimotiki was made the sole official variation of the Greek language, and Katharevousa fell to disuse.

Greece is today relatively homogeneous in linguistic terms, with a large majority of the native population using Greek as their first or only language. Among the Greek-speaking population, speakers of the distinctive Pontic dialect came to Greece from Asia Minor after the Greek genocide and constitute a sizable group. The Cappadocian dialect came to Greece due to the genocide as well, but is endangered and is barely spoken now. Indigenous Greek dialects include the archaic Greek spoken by the Sarakatsani, traditionally transhument mountain shepherds of Greek Macedonia and other parts of Northern Greece. The Tsakonian language, a distinct Greek language deriving from Doric Greek instead of Koine Greek, is still spoken in some villages in the southeastern Peloponnese.

The Muslim minority in Thrace, which amounts to approximately 0.95% of the total population, consists of speakers of Turkish, Bulgarian (Pomaks) and Romani. Romani is also spoken by Christian Roma in other parts of the country. Further minority languages have traditionally been spoken by regional population groups in various parts of the country. Their use has decreased radically in the course of the 20th century through assimilation with the Greek-speaking majority.

Today they are only maintained by the older generations and are on the verge of extinction. This goes for the Arvanites, an Albanian-speaking group mostly located in the rural areas around the capital Athens, and for the Aromanians and Megleno-Romanians, also known as "Vlachs", whose language is closely related to Romanian and who used to live scattered across several areas of mountainous central Greece. Members of these groups usually identify ethnically as Greek and are today all at least bilingual in Greek.

Near the northern Greek borders there are also some Slavic–speaking groups, locally known as Slavomacedonian-speaking, most of whose members identify ethnically as Greeks. It is estimated that after the population exchanges of 1923, Macedonia had 200,000 to 400,000 Slavic speakers. The Jewish community in Greece traditionally spoke Ladino (Judeo-Spanish), today maintained only by a few thousand speakers. Other notable minority languages include Armenian, Georgian, and the Greco-Turkic dialect spoken by the Urums, a community of Caucasus Greeks from the Tsalka region of central Georgia and ethnic Greeks from southeastern Ukraine who arrived in mainly Northern Greece as economic migrants in the 1990s.

Migration 

Throughout the 20th century, millions of Greeks migrated to the United States, United Kingdom, Australia, Canada, and Germany, creating a large Greek diaspora. Net migration started to show positive numbers from the 1970s, but until the beginning of the 1990s, the main influx was that of returning Greek migrants or of Pontic Greeks and others from Russia, Georgia, Turkey the Czech Republic, and elsewhere in the former Soviet Bloc.

A study from the Mediterranean Migration Observatory maintains that the 2001 census recorded 762,191 persons residing in Greece without Greek citizenship, constituting around 7% of the total population. Of the non-citizen residents, 48,560 were EU or European Free Trade Association nationals and 17,426 were Cypriots with privileged status. The majority come from Eastern European countries: Albania (56%), Bulgaria (5%) and Romania (3%), while migrants from the former Soviet Union (Georgia, Russia, Ukraine, Moldova, etc.) comprise 10% of the total. Some of the immigrants from Albania are from the Greek minority in Albania centred on the region of Northern Epirus. In addition, the total Albanian national population which includes temporary migrants and undocumented persons is around 600,000.

The 2011 census recorded 9,903,268 Greek citizens (91.56%), 480,824 Albanian citizens (4.44%), 75,915 Bulgarian citizens (0.7%), 46,523 Romanian citizenship (0.43%), 34,177 Pakistani citizens (0.32%), 27,400 Georgian citizens (0.25%) and 247,090 people had other or unidentified citizenship (2.3%). 189,000 people of the total population of Albanian citizens were reported in 2008 as ethnic Greeks from Southern Albania, in the historical region of Northern Epirus.

The greatest cluster of non-EU immigrant population are the larger urban centers, especially the Municipality of Athens, with 132,000 immigrants comprising 17% of the local population, and then Thessaloniki, with 27,000 immigrants reaching 7% of the local population. There is also a considerable number of co-ethnics that came from the Greek communities of Albania and the former Soviet Union.

Greece, together with Italy and Spain, is a major entry point for illegal immigrants trying to enter the EU. Illegal immigrants entering Greece mostly do so from the border with Turkey at the Evros River and the islands of the eastern Aegean across from Turkey (mainly Lesbos, Chios, Kos, and Samos). In 2012, the majority of illegal immigrants entering Greece came from Afghanistan, followed by Pakistanis and Bangladeshis. In 2015, arrivals of refugees by sea had increased dramatically mainly due to the ongoing Syrian civil war. There were 856,723 arrivals by sea in Greece, an almost fivefold increase to the same period of 2014, of which the Syrians represent almost 45%. The majority of refugees and migrants use Greece as a transit country, while their intended destinations are northern European Nations such as Austria, Germany and Sweden.

Education 

Greeks have a long tradition of valuing and investing in paideia (education), which was upheld as one of the highest societal values in the Greek and Hellenistic world. The first European institution described as a university was founded in fifth-century Constantinople and continued operating in various incarnations until the city's fall to the Ottomans in 1453. The University of Constantinople was Christian Europe's first secular institution of higher learning, and by some measures was the world's first university.

Compulsory education in Greece comprises primary schools (Δημοτικό Σχολείο, Dimotikó Scholeio) and gymnasium (Γυμνάσιο). Nursery schools (Παιδικός σταθμός, Paidikós Stathmós) are popular but not compulsory. Kindergartens (Νηπιαγωγείο, Nipiagogeío) are now compulsory for any child above four years of age. Children start primary school aged six and remain there for six years. Attendance at gymnasia starts at age 12 and lasts for three years.

Greece's post-compulsory secondary education consists of two school types: unified upper secondary schools (Γενικό Λύκειο, Genikό Lykeiό) and technical–vocational educational schools (Τεχνικά και Επαγγελματικά Εκπαιδευτήρια, "TEE"). Post-compulsory secondary education also includes vocational training institutes (Ινστιτούτα Επαγγελματικής Κατάρτισης, "IEK") which provide a formal but unclassified level of education. As they can accept both Gymnasio (lower secondary school) and Lykeio (upper secondary school) graduates, these institutes are not classified as offering a particular level of education.

According to the Framework Law (3549/2007), Public higher education "Highest Educational Institutions" (Ανώτατα Εκπαιδευτικά Ιδρύματα, Anótata Ekpaideytiká Idrýmata, "ΑΕΙ") consists of two parallel sectors:the university sector (Universities, Polytechnics, Fine Arts Schools, the Open University) and the Technological sector (Technological Education Institutions (TEI) and the School of Pedagogic and Technological Education). There are also State Non-University Tertiary Institutes offering vocationally oriented courses of shorter duration (2 to 3 years) which operate under the authority of other Ministries. Students are admitted to these Institutes according to their performance at national level examinations taking place after completion of the third grade of Lykeio. Additionally, students over twenty-two years old may be admitted to the Hellenic Open University through a form of lottery. The Capodistrian University of Athens is the oldest university in the eastern Mediterranean.

The Greek education system also provides special kindergartens, primary, and secondary schools for people with special needs or difficulties in learning. There are also specialist gymnasia and high schools offering musical, theological, and physical education.

Seventy-two percent of Greek adults aged 25–64 have completed upper secondary education, which is slightly less than the OECD average of 74 percent. The average Greek pupil scored 458 in reading literacy, maths and science in the OECD's 2015 Programme for International Student Assessment (PISA). This score is lower than the OECD average of 486. On average, girls outperformed boys by 15 points, much more than the average OECD gap of two points.

Healthcare system 

Greece has universal health care. The system is mixed, combining a national health service with social health insurance (SHI). 2000 World Health Organization report, its health care system ranked 14th in overall performance of 191 countries surveyed. In a 2013 Save the Children report, Greece was ranked the 19th out of 176 countries for the state of mothers and newborn babies. In 2010, there were 138 hospitals with 31,000 beds, but in 2011, the Ministry of Health announced plans to decrease the number to 77 hospitals with 36,035 beds to reduce expenses and further enhance healthcare standards. However, as of 2014, there were 124 public hospitals, of which 106 were general hospitals and 18 specialised hospitals, with a total capacity of about 30,000 beds.

Greece's healthcare expenditures as a percentage of GDP were 9.6% in 2007, just above the OECD average of 9.5%. By 2015, spending declined to 8.4% of GDP (compared with the EU average of 9.5%), a decline of one-fifth since 2010. Nevertheless, the country maintains the highest doctor-to-population ratio of any OECD country and the highest doctor-to-patient ratio in the EU.

Life expectancy in Greece is among the highest in the world; a 2011 OECD report placed it at 80.3 years, above the OECD average of 79.5, while a more recent 2017 study found life expectancy in 2015 to be 81.1 years, slightly above the EU average of 80.6. The island of Icaria has the highest percentage of nonagenarians in the world; approximately 33% of islanders are 90 or older. Icaria is subsequently classified as a "Blue Zone", a region where people allegedly live longer than average and have lower rates of cancer, heart disease, or other chronic illnesses.

The 2011 OECD report showed that Greece had the largest percentage of adult daily smokers of any of the 34 OECD members. The country's obesity rate is 18.1%, which is above the OECD average of 15.1%, but considerably lower than the American rate of 27.7%. In 2008, Greece had the highest rate of perceived good health in the OECD, at 98.5%. Infant mortality, with a rate of 3.6 deaths per 1,000 live births, was below the 2007 OECD average of 4.9.

Culture 

The culture of Greece has evolved over thousands of years, beginning in Mycenaean Greece and continuing most notably into Classical Greece, through the influence of the Roman Empire and its Greek Eastern continuation, the Eastern Roman or Byzantine Empire. Other cultures and nations, such as the Latin and Frankish states, the Ottoman Empire, the Venetian Republic, the Genoese Republic, and the British Empire have also left their influence on modern Greek culture, although historians credit the Greek War of Independence with revitalising Greece and giving birth to a single, cohesive entity of its multi-faceted culture.

In ancient times, Greece was the birthplace of Western culture. Modern democracies owe a debt to Greek beliefs in government by the people, trial by jury, and equality under the law. The ancient Greeks pioneered in many fields that rely on systematic thought, including logic, biology, geometry, government, geography, medicine, history, philosophy, physics, and mathematics. They introduced such important literary forms as epic and lyrical poetry, history, tragedy, comedy and drama. In their pursuit of order and proportion, the Greeks created an ideal of beauty that strongly influenced Western art.

Visual arts 

Artistic production in Greece began in the prehistoric pre-Greek Cycladic and the Minoan civilizations, both of which were influenced by local traditions and the art of ancient Egypt.

There were several interconnected traditions of painting in ancient Greece. Due to their technical differences, they underwent somewhat differentiated developments. Not all painting techniques are equally well represented in the archaeological record. The most respected form of art, according to authors like Pliny or Pausanias, were individual, mobile paintings on wooden boards, technically described as panel paintings. Also, the tradition of wall painting in Greece goes back at least to the Minoan and Mycenaean Bronze Age, with the lavish fresco decoration of sites like Knossos, Tiryns and Mycenae. Much of the figural or architectural sculpture of ancient Greece was painted colourfully. This aspect of Greek stonework is described as polychrome.  

Ancient Greek sculpture was composed almost entirely of marble or bronze; with cast bronze becoming the favoured medium for major works by the early 5th century. Both marble and bronze are easy to form and very durable. Chryselephantine sculptures, used for temple cult images and luxury works, used gold, most often in leaf form and ivory for all or parts (faces and hands) of the figure, and probably gems and other materials, but were much less common, and only fragments have survived. By the early 19th century, the systematic excavation of ancient Greek sites had brought forth a plethora of sculptures with traces of notably multicolored surfaces. It was not until published findings by German archaeologist Vinzenz Brinkmann in the late 20th century, that the painting of ancient Greek sculptures became an established fact.

The art production continued also during the Byzantine era. The most salient feature of this new aesthetic was its "abstract", or anti-naturalistic character. If classical art was marked by the attempt to create representations that mimicked reality as closely as possible, Byzantine art seems to have abandoned this attempt in favour of a more symbolic approach. The Byzantine painting concentrated mainly on icons and hagiographies. The Macedonian art (Byzantine) was the artistic expression of Macedonian Renaissance, a label sometimes used to describe the period of the Macedonian dynasty of the Byzantine Empire (867–1056), especially the 10th century, which some scholars have seen as a time of increased interest in classical scholarship and the assimilation of classical motifs into Christian artwork.

Post Byzantine art schools include the Cretan School and Heptanese School. The first artistic movement in the Greek Kingdom can be considered the Greek academic art of the 19th century (Munich School). Notable modern Greek painters include Nikolaos Gyzis, Georgios Jakobides, Theodoros Vryzakis, Nikiforos Lytras, Konstantinos Volanakis, Nikos Engonopoulos and Yannis Tsarouchis, while some notable sculptors are Pavlos Prosalentis, Ioannis Kossos, Leonidas Drosis, Georgios Bonanos and Yannoulis Chalepas.

Architecture 

The architecture of ancient Greece was produced by the ancient Greeks (Hellenes), whose culture flourished on the Greek mainland, the Aegean Islands and their colonies, for a period from about 900 BC until the 1st century AD, with the earliest remaining architectural works dating from around 600 BC. The formal vocabulary of ancient Greek architecture, in particular the division of architectural style into three defined orders: the Doric Order, the Ionic Order and the Corinthian Order, was to have profound effect on Western architecture of later periods.

Byzantine architecture is the architecture promoted by the Byzantine Empire, also known as the Eastern Roman Empire, which dominated Greece and the Greek speaking world during the Middle Ages. The empire endured for more than a millennium, dramatically influencing Medieval architecture throughout Europe and the Near East, and becoming the primary progenitor of the Renaissance and Ottoman architectural traditions that followed its collapse.

After the Greek Independence, the modern Greek architects tried to combine traditional Greek and Byzantine elements and motives with the western European movements and styles. Patras was the first city of the modern Greek state to develop a city plan. In January 1829, Stamatis Voulgaris, a Greek engineer of the French army, presented the plan of the new city to the Governor Kapodistrias, who approved it. Voulgaris applied the orthogonal rule in the urban complex of Patras.

Two special genres can be considered the Cycladic architecture, featuring white-coloured houses, in the Cyclades and the Epirotic architecture in the region of Epirus. Important is also the influence of the Venetian style in the Ionian islands and the "Mediterranean style" of Florestano Di Fausto (during the years of the fascist regime) in the Dodecanese islands.

After the establishment of the Greek Kingdom, the architecture of Athens and other cities was mostly influenced by the Neoclassical architecture. For Athens, the first King of Greece, Otto of Greece, commissioned the architects Stamatios Kleanthis and Eduard Schaubert to design a modern city plan fit for the capital of a state. As for Thessaloniki, after the fire of 1917, the government ordered for a new city plan under the supervision of Ernest Hébrard. Other modern Greek architects include Anastasios Metaxas, Lysandros Kaftanzoglou, Panagis Kalkos, Ernst Ziller, Xenophon Paionidis, Dimitris Pikionis and Georges Candilis.

There is an emerging need to secure the long-term preservation of the archaeological sites and monuments of Greece against the growing threats of climate change.

Theatre 

Theatre in its western form was born in Greece. The city-state of Classical Athens, which became a significant cultural, political, and military power during this period, was its centre, where it was institutionalised as part of a festival called the Dionysia, which honoured the god Dionysus. Tragedy (late 6th century BC), comedy (486 BC), and the satyr play were the three dramatic genres to emerge there.

During the Byzantine period, the theatrical art was heavily declined. According to Marios Ploritis, the only form survived was the folk theatre (Mimos and Pantomimos), despite the hostility of the official state. Later, during the Ottoman period, the main theatrical folk art was the Karagiozis. The renaissance which led to the modern Greek theatre, took place in the Venetian Crete. Significal dramatists include Vitsentzos Kornaros and Georgios Chortatzis.

The modern Greek theatre was born after the Greek independence, in the early 19th century, and initially was influenced by the Heptanesean theatre and melodrama, such as the Italian opera. The Nobile Teatro di San Giacomo di Corfù was the first theatre and opera house of modern Greece and the place where the first Greek opera, Spyridon Xyndas' The Parliamentary Candidate (based on an exclusively Greek libretto) was performed. During the late 19th and early 20th century, the Athenian theatre scene was dominated by revues, musical comedies, operettas and nocturnes and notable playwrights included Spyridon Samaras, Dionysios Lavrangas, Theophrastos Sakellaridis and others.

The National Theatre of Greece was opened in 1900 as Royal Theatre. Notable playwrights of the modern Greek theatre include Gregorios Xenopoulos, Nikos Kazantzakis, Pantelis Horn, Alekos Sakellarios and Iakovos Kambanelis, while notable actors include Cybele Andrianou, Marika Kotopouli, Aimilios Veakis, Orestis Makris, Katina Paxinou, Manos Katrakis and Dimitris Horn. Significant directors include Dimitris Rontiris, Alexis Minotis and Karolos Koun.

Literature 

Greek literature can be divided into three main categories: Ancient, Byzantine and modern Greek literature.

Athens is considered the birthplace of Western literature. At the beginning of Greek literature stand the two monumental works of Homer: the Iliad and the Odyssey. Though dates of composition vary, these works were fixed around 800 BC or after. In the classical period many of the genres of western literature became more prominent. Lyrical poetry, odes, pastorals, elegies, epigrams; dramatic presentations of comedy and tragedy; historiography, rhetorical treatises, philosophical dialectics, and philosophical treatises all arose in this period. The two major lyrical poets were Sappho and Pindar. The Classical era also saw the dawn of drama.

Of the hundreds of tragedies written and performed during the classical age, only a limited number of plays by three authors have survived: those of Aeschylus, Sophocles, and Euripides. The surviving plays by Aristophanes are also a treasure trove of comic presentation, while Herodotus and Thucydides are two of the most influential historians in this period. The greatest prose achievement of the 4th century was in philosophy with the works of the three great philosophers.

Byzantine literature refers to literature of the Byzantine Empire written in Atticizing, Medieval and early Modern Greek, and it is the expression of the intellectual life of the Byzantine Greeks during the Christian Middle Ages. Although popular Byzantine literature and early Modern Greek literature both began in the 11th century, the two are indistinguishable.

Modern Greek literature refers to literature written in common Modern Greek, emerging from late Byzantine times in the 11th century. The Cretan Renaissance poem Erotokritos is considered the masterpiece of this period of Greek literature. It is a verse romance written around 1600 by Vitsentzos Kornaros (1553–1613). Later, during the period of Greek enlightenment (Diafotismos), writers such as Adamantios Korais and Rigas Feraios prepared with their works the Greek Revolution (1821–1830).

Leading figures of modern Greek literature include Dionysios Solomos, Andreas Kalvos, Angelos Sikelianos, Emmanuel Rhoides, Demetrius Vikelas, Kostis Palamas, Penelope Delta, Yannis Ritsos, Alexandros Papadiamantis, Nikos Kazantzakis, Andreas Embeirikos, Kostas Karyotakis, Gregorios Xenopoulos, Constantine P. Cavafy, Nikos Kavvadias, Kostas Varnalis and Kiki Dimoula. Two Greek authors have been awarded the Nobel Prize in Literature: George Seferis in 1963 and Odysseas Elytis in 1979.

Philosophy 

Most western philosophical traditions began in Ancient Greece in the 6th century BC. The first philosophers are called "Presocratics", which designates that they came before Socrates, whose contributions mark a turning point in western thought. The Presocratics were from the western or the eastern colonies of Greece and only fragments of their original writings survive, in some cases merely a single sentence.

A new period of philosophy started with Socrates. Like the Sophists, he rejected entirely the physical speculations in which his predecessors had indulged, and made the thoughts and opinions of people his starting-point. Aspects of Socrates were first united from Plato, who also combined with them many of the principles established by earlier philosophers, and developed the whole of this material into the unity of a comprehensive system.

Aristotle of Stagira, the most important disciple of Plato, shared with his teacher the title of the greatest philosopher of antiquity. But while Plato had sought to elucidate and explain things from the supra-sensual standpoint of the forms, his pupil preferred to start from the facts given to us by experience. Except from these three most significant Greek philosophers other known schools of Greek philosophy from other founders during ancient times were Stoicism, Epicureanism, Skepticism and Neoplatonism.

Byzantine philosophy refers to the distinctive philosophical ideas of the philosophers and scholars of the Byzantine Empire, especially between the 8th and 15th centuries. It was characterised by a Christian world-view, but one which could draw ideas directly from the Greek texts of Plato, Aristotle, and the Neoplatonists.

On the eve of the Fall of Constantinople, Gemistus Pletho tried to restore the use of the term "Hellene" and advocated the return to the Olympian Gods of the ancient world. After 1453 a number of Greek Byzantine scholars who fled to western Europe contributed to the Renaissance.

In modern period, Diafotismos (Greek: Διαφωτισμός, "enlightenment", "illumination") was the Greek expression of the Age of Enlightenment and its philosophical and political ideas. Some notable representatives were Adamantios Korais, Rigas Feraios and Theophilos Kairis.

Other modern era Greek philosophers or political scientists include Cornelius Castoriadis, Nicos Poulantzas and Christos Yannaras.

Music and dances 

Greek vocal music extends far back into ancient times where mixed-gender choruses performed for entertainment, celebration and spiritual reasons. Instruments during that period included the double-reed aulos and the plucked string instrument, the lyre, especially the special kind called a kithara. Music played an important role in the education system during ancient times. Boys were taught music from the age of six. Later influences from the Roman Empire, Middle East, and the Byzantine Empire also had effect on Greek music.

While the new technique of polyphony was developing in the West, the Eastern Orthodox Church resisted any type of change. Therefore, Byzantine music remained monophonic and without any form of instrumental accompaniment. As a result, and despite certain attempts by certain Greek chanters (such as Manouel Gazis, Ioannis Plousiadinos or the Cypriot Ieronimos o Tragoudistis), Byzantine music was deprived of elements of which in the West encouraged an unimpeded development of art. However, this method which kept music away from polyphony, along with centuries of continuous culture, enabled monophonic music to develop to the greatest heights of perfection. Byzantium presented the monophonic Byzantine chant; a melodic treasury of inestimable value for its rhythmical variety and expressive power.

Along with the Byzantine (Church) chant and music, the Greek people also cultivated the Greek folk song (Demotiko) which is divided into two cycles, the akritic and klephtic. The akritic was created between the 9th and 10th centuries and expressed the life and struggles of the akrites (frontier guards) of the Byzantine empire, the most well known being the stories associated with Digenes Akritas. The klephtic cycle came into being between the late Byzantine period and the start of the Greek War of Independence. The klephtic cycle, together with historical songs, paraloghes (narrative song or ballad), love songs, mantinades, wedding songs, songs of exile and dirges express the life of the Greeks. There is a unity between the Greek people's struggles for freedom, their joys and sorrow and attitudes towards love and death.

The Heptanesean kantádhes (καντάδες 'serenades'; sing.: καντάδα) became the forerunners of the Greek modern urban popular song, influencing its development to a considerable degree. For the first part of the next century, several Greek composers continued to borrow elements from the Heptanesean style. The most successful songs during the period 1870–1930 were the so-called Athenian serenades, and the songs performed on stage (επιθεωρησιακά τραγούδια 'theatrical revue songs') in revue, operettas and nocturnes that were dominating Athens' theater scene.

Rebetiko, initially a music associated with the lower classes, later (and especially after the population exchange between Greece and Turkey) reached greater general acceptance as the rough edges of its overt subcultural character were softened and polished, sometimes to the point of unrecognizability. It was the base of the later laïkó (song of the people). The leading performers of the genre include Vassilis Tsitsanis, Grigoris Bithikotsis, Stelios Kazantzidis, George Dalaras, Haris Alexiou and Glykeria.

Regarding the classical music, it was through the Ionian islands (which were under western rule and influence) that all the major advances of the western European classical music were introduced to mainland Greeks. The region is notable for the birth of the first School of modern Greek classical music (Heptanesean or Ionian School, Greek: Επτανησιακή Σχολή), established in 1815. Prominent representatives of this genre include Nikolaos Mantzaros, Spyridon Xyndas, Spyridon Samaras and Pavlos Carrer. Manolis Kalomiris is considered the founder of the Greek National School of Music.

In the 20th century, Greek composers have had a significant impact on the development of avant garde and modern classical music, with figures such as Iannis Xenakis, Nikos Skalkottas, and Dimitri Mitropoulos achieving international prominence. At the same time, composers and musicians such as Mikis Theodorakis, Manos Hatzidakis, Eleni Karaindrou, Vangelis and Demis Roussos garnered an international following for their music, which include famous film scores such as Zorba the Greek, Serpico, Never on Sunday, America America, Eternity and a Day, Chariots of Fire, Blade Runner, among others. Greek American composers known for their film scores include also Yanni and Basil Poledouris. Notable Greek opera singers and classical musicians of the 20th and 21st century include Maria Callas, Nana Mouskouri, Mario Frangoulis, Leonidas Kavakos, Dimitris Sgouros and others.

During the dictatorship of the Colonels, the music of Mikis Theodorakis was banned by the junta and the composer was jailed, internally exiled, and put in a concentration camp, before finally being allowed to leave Greece due to international reaction to his detention. Released during the junta years, Anthrope Agapa, ti Fotia Stamata (Make Love, Stop the Gunfire), by the pop group Poll is considered the first anti-war protest song in the history of Greek rock. The song was echoing the hippie slogan Make love, not war and was inspired directly by the Vietnam War, becoming a "smash hit" in Greece.

Greece participated in the Eurovision Song Contest 35 times after its debut at the 1974 Contest. In 2005, Greece won with the song "My Number One", performed by Greek-Swedish singer Elena Paparizou. The song received 230 points with 10 sets of 12 points from Belgium, Bulgaria, Hungary, the United Kingdom, Turkey, Albania, Cyprus, Serbia & Montenegro, Sweden and Germany and also became a smash hit in different countries and especially in Greece. The 51st Eurovision Song Contest was held in Athens at the Olympic Indoor Hall of the Athens Olympic Sports Complex in Maroussi, with hosted by Maria Menounos and Sakis Rouvas.

Cuisine 

Greek cuisine is characteristic of the Mediterranean diet, which is epitomised by dishes of Crete. Greek cuisine incorporates fresh ingredients into a variety of local dishes such as moussaka, pastitsio, classic Greek salad, fasolada, spanakopita and souvlaki. Some dishes can be traced back to ancient Greece like skordalia (a thick purée of walnuts, almonds, crushed garlic and olive oil), lentil soup, retsina (white or rosé wine sealed with pine resin) and pasteli (candy bar with sesame seeds baked with honey). Throughout Greece people often enjoy eating from small dishes such as meze with various dips such as tzatziki, grilled octopus and small fish, feta cheese, dolmades (rice, currants and pine kernels wrapped in vine leaves), various pulses, olives and cheese. Olive oil is added to almost every dish.

Some sweet desserts include melomakarona, diples and galaktoboureko, and drinks such as ouzo, metaxa and a variety of wines including retsina. Greek cuisine differs widely from different parts of the mainland and from island to island. It uses some flavorings more often than other Mediterranean cuisines: oregano, mint, garlic, onion, dill and bay laurel leaves. Other common herbs and spices include basil, thyme and fennel seed. Many Greek recipes, especially in the northern parts of the country, use "sweet" spices in combination with meat, for example cinnamon and cloves in stews.

Koutoukia are an underground restaurant common in Greece.

Cinema 

Cinema first appeared in Greece in 1896, but the first actual cine-theatre was opened in 1907 in Athens. In 1914, the Asty Films Company was founded and the production of long films began. Golfo (Γκόλφω), a well known traditional love story, is considered the first Greek feature film, although there were several minor productions such as newscasts before this. In 1931, Orestis Laskos directed Daphnis and Chloe (Δάφνις και Χλόη), containing one of the first nude scene in the history of European cinema; it was also the first Greek movie which was played abroad. In 1944, Katina Paxinou was honoured with the Best Supporting Actress Academy Award for For Whom the Bell Tolls.

The 1950s and early 1960s are considered by many to be a "golden age" of Greek cinema. Directors and actors of this era were recognised as important figures in Greece and some gained international acclaim: George Tzavellas, Irene Papas, Melina Mercouri, Michael Cacoyannis, Alekos Sakellarios, Nikos Tsiforos, Iakovos Kambanelis, Katina Paxinou, Nikos Koundouros, Ellie Lambeti and others. More than sixty films per year were made, with the majority having film noir elements. Some notable films include The Drunkard (1950, directed by George Tzavellas), The Counterfeit Coin (1955, by Giorgos Tzavellas), Πικρό Ψωμί (1951, by Grigoris Grigoriou), O Drakos (1956, by Nikos Koundouros), Stella (1955, directed by Cacoyannis and written by Kampanellis), Woe to the Young (1961, by Alekos Sakellarios), Glory Sky (1962, by Takis Kanellopoulos) and The Red Lanterns (1963, by Vasilis Georgiadis)

Cacoyannis also directed Zorba the Greek with Anthony Quinn which received Best Director, Best Adapted Screenplay and Best Film nominations. Finos Film also contributed in this period with movies such as Λατέρνα, Φτώχεια και Φιλότιμο, Madalena, I theia ap' to Chicago, Το ξύλο βγήκε από τον Παράδεισο and many more.

During the 1970s and 1980s, Theo Angelopoulos directed a series of notable and appreciated movies. His film Eternity and a Day won the Palme d'Or and the Prize of the Ecumenical Jury at the 1998 Cannes Film Festival.

There are also internationally renowned filmmakers in the Greek diaspora, such as the Greek-French Costa-Gavras and the Greek-Americans Elia Kazan, John Cassavetes and Alexander Payne.
More recently Yorgos Lanthimos (film and stage director, producer, and screenwriter) has received four Academy Award nominations for his work, including Best Foreign Language Film for Dogtooth (2009), Best Original Screenplay for The Lobster (2015), and Best Picture and Best Director for The Favourite (2018).

Sports 

Greece is the birthplace of the ancient Olympic Games, first recorded in 776 BC in Olympia, and hosted the modern Olympic Games twice, the inaugural 1896 Summer Olympics and the 2004 Summer Olympics. During the parade of nations, Greece is always called first, as the founding nation of the ancient precursor of modern Olympics. The nation has competed at every Summer Olympic Games, one of only four countries to have done so. Having won a total of 110 medals (30 gold, 42 silver and 38 bronze), Greece is ranked 32nd by gold medals in the all-time Summer Olympic medal count. Their best ever performance was in the 1896 Summer Olympics, when Greece finished second in the medal table with 10 gold medals.

The Greece national football team, ranking 12th in the world in 2014 (and having reached a high of 8th in the world in 2008 and 2011), were crowned European Champions in Euro 2004 in one of the biggest upsets in the history of the sport. The Greek Super League is the highest professional football league in the country, comprising fourteen teams. The most successful are Olympiacos, Panathinaikos, and AEK Athens.

The Greek national basketball team has a decades-long tradition of excellence in the sport, being considered among the world's top basketball powers. , it ranked 4th in the world and 2nd in Europe. They have won the European Championship twice in 1987 and 2005, and have reached the final four in two of the last four FIBA World Championships, taking the second place in the world in 2006 FIBA World Championship, after a 101–95 win against Team USA in the tournament's semi-final. The domestic top basketball league, A1 Ethniki, is composed of fourteen teams. The most successful Greek teams are Panathinaikos, Olympiacos, Aris Thessaloniki, AEK Athens and P.A.O.K. Greek basketball teams are the most successful in European basketball the last 25 years, having won 9 Euroleagues since the establishment of the modern era Euroleague Final Four format in 1988, while no other nation has won more than 4 Euroleague championships in this period. Besides the 9 Euroleagues, Greek basketball teams (Panathinaikos, Olympiacos, Aris Thessaloniki, AEK Athens, P.A.O.K, Maroussi) have won 3 Triple Crowns, 5 Saporta Cups, 2 Korać Cups and 1 FIBA Europe Champions Cup. After the 2005 European Championship triumph of the Greek national basketball team, Greece became the reigning European Champion in both football and basketball.

The Greece women's national water polo team have emerged as one of the leading powers in the world, becoming World Champions after their gold medal win against the hosts China at the 2011 World Championship. They also won the silver medal at the 2004 Summer Olympics, the gold medal at the 2005 World League and the silver medals at the 2010 and 2012 European Championships. The Greece men's national water polo team became the third best water polo team in the world in 2005, after their win against Croatia in the bronze medal game at the 2005 World Aquatics Championships in Canada. The domestic top water polo leagues, Greek Men's Water Polo League and Greek Women's Water Polo League are considered amongst the top national leagues in European water polo, as its clubs have made significant success in European competitions. In men's European competitions, Olympiacos has won the Champions League, the European Super Cup and the Triple Crown in 2002 becoming the first club in water polo history to win every title in which it has competed within a single year (National championship, National cup, Champions League and European Super Cup), while NC Vouliagmeni has won the LEN Cup Winners' Cup in 1997. In women's European competitions, Greek water polo teams (NC Vouliagmeni, Glyfada NSC, Olympiacos, Ethnikos Piraeus) are amongst the most successful in European water polο, having won 4 LEN Champions Cups, 3 LEN Trophies and 2 European Supercups.

The Greek men's national volleyball team has won two bronze medals, one in the European Volleyball Championship and another one in the Men's European Volleyball League, a 5th place in the Olympic Games and a 6th place in the FIVB Volleyball Men's World Championship. The Greek league, the A1 Ethniki, is considered one of the top volleyball leagues in Europe and the Greek clubs have had significant success in European competitions. Olympiacos is the most successful volleyball club in the country having won the most domestic titles and being the only Greek club to have won European titles; they have won two CEV Cups, they have been CEV Champions League runners-up twice and they have played in 12 Final Fours in the European competitions, making them one of the most traditional volleyball clubs in Europe. Iraklis have also seen significant success in European competitions, having been three times runners-up of the CEV Champions League.

In handball, AC Diomidis Argous is the only Greek club to have won a European Cup.

Apart from these, cricket is relatively popular in Corfu.

Mythology 

The numerous gods of the ancient Greek religion as well as the mythical heroes and events of the ancient Greek epics (The Odyssey and The Iliad) and other pieces of art and literature from the time make up what is nowadays colloquially referred to as Greek mythology. Apart from serving a religious function, the mythology of the ancient Greek world also served a cosmological role as it was meant to try to explain how the world was formed and operated.

The principal gods of the ancient Greek religion were the Dodekatheon, or the Twelve Gods, who lived on the top of Mount Olympus. The most important of all ancient Greek gods was Zeus, the king of the gods, who was married to his sister, Hera. The other Greek gods that made up the Twelve Olympians were Ares, Poseidon, Athena, Demeter, Dionysus, Apollo, Artemis, Aphrodite, Hephaestus, and Hermes. Despite her humble status within the hierarchy of the Olympians, Hestia, the goddess of the hearth and sacred flame, was likely the most prayed to of all gods. It is believed that essentially all home offering ceremonies and most public festival offerings began and ended with an invocation and offering to Hestia. Apart from these 13 gods, the Greek pantheon was filled with dozens of other gods, demigods, and mortal and immortal beings which varied by local and over the evolution of Greek culture. A variety of other mystical beliefs and nature spirits such as nymphs and other magical creatures were foundational to the ancient Greek understanding of the world around them.

Public holidays and festivals 

According to Greek law, every Sunday of the year is a public holiday. Since the late '70s, Saturday also is a non-school and not working day. In addition, there are four mandatory official public holidays: 25 March (Greek Independence Day), Easter Monday, 15 August (Assumption or Dormition of the Holy Virgin), and 25 December (Christmas). 1 May (Labour Day) and 28 October (Ohi Day) are regulated by law as being optional but it is customary for employees to be given the day off. There are, however, more public holidays celebrated in Greece than are announced by the Ministry of Labour each year as either obligatory or optional. The list of these non-fixed national holidays rarely changes and has not changed in recent decades, giving a total of eleven national holidays each year.

In addition to the national holidays, there are public holidays that are not celebrated nationwide, but only by a specific professional group or a local community. For example, many municipalities have a "Patron Saint" parallel to "Name Days", or a "Liberation Day". On such days it is customary for schools to take the day off.

Notable festivals, beyond the religious fests, include Patras Carnival, Athens Festival and various local wine festivals. The city of Thessaloniki is also home of a number of festivals and events. The Thessaloniki International Film Festival is one of the most important film festivals in Southern Europe.

See also 

 Outline of Greece
 Outline of ancient Greece
 Index of Greece-related articles

Notes

References

Citations

Bibliography 

 "Minorities in Greece – Historical Issues and New Perspectives". History and Culture of South Eastern Europe. An Annual Journal. München (Slavica) 2003.

, 257 pp.
.

, 376 pp.
 
, 219 pp. The impact of European Union membership on Greek politics, economics, and society.

.
.

External links 

 
1821 establishments in Europe
Balkan countries
Countries in Europe
Member states of NATO
Member states of the European Union
Member states of the Organisation internationale de la Francophonie
Member states of the Union for the Mediterranean
Member states of the United Nations
New Testament places
Republics
Southeastern European countries
Southern European countries
Greek-speaking countries and territories
States and territories established in 1821
Christian states
Transcontinental countries
OECD members